

369001–369100 

|-bgcolor=#E9E9E9
| 369001 ||  || — || April 16, 2007 || Mount Lemmon || Mount Lemmon Survey || — || align=right | 1.6 km || 
|-id=002 bgcolor=#d6d6d6
| 369002 ||  || — || April 22, 2007 || Mount Lemmon || Mount Lemmon Survey || EOS || align=right | 1.7 km || 
|-id=003 bgcolor=#d6d6d6
| 369003 ||  || — || April 23, 2007 || Kitt Peak || Spacewatch || — || align=right | 2.7 km || 
|-id=004 bgcolor=#d6d6d6
| 369004 ||  || — || April 24, 2007 || Kitt Peak || Spacewatch || — || align=right | 2.6 km || 
|-id=005 bgcolor=#d6d6d6
| 369005 ||  || — || May 7, 2007 || Kitt Peak || Spacewatch || — || align=right | 4.0 km || 
|-id=006 bgcolor=#d6d6d6
| 369006 ||  || — || May 10, 2007 || Mount Lemmon || Mount Lemmon Survey || — || align=right | 2.9 km || 
|-id=007 bgcolor=#E9E9E9
| 369007 ||  || — || May 10, 2007 || Mount Lemmon || Mount Lemmon Survey || NEM || align=right | 2.8 km || 
|-id=008 bgcolor=#d6d6d6
| 369008 ||  || — || June 8, 2007 || Kitt Peak || Spacewatch || — || align=right | 3.1 km || 
|-id=009 bgcolor=#d6d6d6
| 369009 ||  || — || June 9, 2007 || Kitt Peak || Spacewatch || — || align=right | 2.4 km || 
|-id=010 bgcolor=#d6d6d6
| 369010 ||  || — || July 18, 2007 || Crimea-Simeis || Simeiz Obs. || — || align=right | 4.4 km || 
|-id=011 bgcolor=#d6d6d6
| 369011 ||  || — || August 8, 2007 || Socorro || LINEAR || — || align=right | 4.7 km || 
|-id=012 bgcolor=#d6d6d6
| 369012 ||  || — || August 15, 2007 || Bisei SG Center || BATTeRS || — || align=right | 4.4 km || 
|-id=013 bgcolor=#d6d6d6
| 369013 ||  || — || September 10, 2007 || Kitt Peak || Spacewatch || — || align=right | 3.6 km || 
|-id=014 bgcolor=#d6d6d6
| 369014 ||  || — || September 4, 2007 || Mount Lemmon || Mount Lemmon Survey || URS || align=right | 3.3 km || 
|-id=015 bgcolor=#fefefe
| 369015 ||  || — || October 4, 2007 || Kitt Peak || Spacewatch || — || align=right data-sort-value="0.54" | 540 m || 
|-id=016 bgcolor=#fefefe
| 369016 ||  || — || October 7, 2007 || Socorro || LINEAR || — || align=right data-sort-value="0.73" | 730 m || 
|-id=017 bgcolor=#d6d6d6
| 369017 ||  || — || October 8, 2007 || Anderson Mesa || LONEOS || — || align=right | 4.9 km || 
|-id=018 bgcolor=#d6d6d6
| 369018 ||  || — || October 8, 2007 || Anderson Mesa || LONEOS || 7:4 || align=right | 4.0 km || 
|-id=019 bgcolor=#fefefe
| 369019 ||  || — || October 8, 2007 || Kitt Peak || Spacewatch || NYS || align=right data-sort-value="0.72" | 720 m || 
|-id=020 bgcolor=#fefefe
| 369020 ||  || — || September 15, 2007 || Kitt Peak || Spacewatch || — || align=right data-sort-value="0.65" | 650 m || 
|-id=021 bgcolor=#d6d6d6
| 369021 ||  || — || October 14, 2007 || Mount Lemmon || Mount Lemmon Survey || 3:2 || align=right | 4.6 km || 
|-id=022 bgcolor=#fefefe
| 369022 ||  || — || October 10, 2007 || Catalina || CSS || — || align=right | 1.0 km || 
|-id=023 bgcolor=#fefefe
| 369023 ||  || — || October 3, 2007 || Kitt Peak || Spacewatch || — || align=right data-sort-value="0.77" | 770 m || 
|-id=024 bgcolor=#fefefe
| 369024 ||  || — || November 9, 2007 || Kitt Peak || Spacewatch || — || align=right data-sort-value="0.83" | 830 m || 
|-id=025 bgcolor=#fefefe
| 369025 ||  || — || November 14, 2007 || Bisei SG Center || BATTeRS || — || align=right data-sort-value="0.61" | 610 m || 
|-id=026 bgcolor=#fefefe
| 369026 ||  || — || November 1, 2007 || Kitt Peak || Spacewatch || FLO || align=right | 1.6 km || 
|-id=027 bgcolor=#fefefe
| 369027 ||  || — || November 4, 2007 || Kitt Peak || Spacewatch || — || align=right data-sort-value="0.87" | 870 m || 
|-id=028 bgcolor=#fefefe
| 369028 ||  || — || December 15, 2007 || Kitt Peak || Spacewatch || V || align=right data-sort-value="0.63" | 630 m || 
|-id=029 bgcolor=#fefefe
| 369029 ||  || — || November 12, 2007 || Mount Lemmon || Mount Lemmon Survey || FLO || align=right data-sort-value="0.68" | 680 m || 
|-id=030 bgcolor=#fefefe
| 369030 ||  || — || December 18, 2007 || Mount Lemmon || Mount Lemmon Survey || — || align=right data-sort-value="0.83" | 830 m || 
|-id=031 bgcolor=#fefefe
| 369031 ||  || — || December 30, 2007 || Kitt Peak || Spacewatch || NYS || align=right data-sort-value="0.69" | 690 m || 
|-id=032 bgcolor=#fefefe
| 369032 ||  || — || October 2, 2006 || Mount Lemmon || Mount Lemmon Survey || MAS || align=right data-sort-value="0.99" | 990 m || 
|-id=033 bgcolor=#fefefe
| 369033 ||  || — || January 11, 2008 || Kitt Peak || Spacewatch || — || align=right data-sort-value="0.68" | 680 m || 
|-id=034 bgcolor=#fefefe
| 369034 ||  || — || January 13, 2008 || Kitt Peak || Spacewatch || — || align=right data-sort-value="0.94" | 940 m || 
|-id=035 bgcolor=#fefefe
| 369035 ||  || — || December 30, 2007 || Kitt Peak || Spacewatch || MAS || align=right data-sort-value="0.71" | 710 m || 
|-id=036 bgcolor=#fefefe
| 369036 ||  || — || November 11, 2007 || Mount Lemmon || Mount Lemmon Survey || — || align=right data-sort-value="0.92" | 920 m || 
|-id=037 bgcolor=#fefefe
| 369037 ||  || — || January 11, 2008 || Kitt Peak || Spacewatch || V || align=right data-sort-value="0.73" | 730 m || 
|-id=038 bgcolor=#fefefe
| 369038 ||  || — || October 19, 2003 || Palomar || NEAT || V || align=right data-sort-value="0.60" | 600 m || 
|-id=039 bgcolor=#fefefe
| 369039 ||  || — || December 31, 2007 || Mount Lemmon || Mount Lemmon Survey || — || align=right data-sort-value="0.93" | 930 m || 
|-id=040 bgcolor=#fefefe
| 369040 ||  || — || November 11, 2007 || Mount Lemmon || Mount Lemmon Survey || — || align=right | 1.1 km || 
|-id=041 bgcolor=#fefefe
| 369041 ||  || — || January 31, 2008 || Mount Lemmon || Mount Lemmon Survey || — || align=right data-sort-value="0.81" | 810 m || 
|-id=042 bgcolor=#fefefe
| 369042 ||  || — || February 3, 2008 || Kitt Peak || Spacewatch || — || align=right data-sort-value="0.72" | 720 m || 
|-id=043 bgcolor=#fefefe
| 369043 ||  || — || February 6, 2008 || Anderson Mesa || LONEOS || — || align=right data-sort-value="0.95" | 950 m || 
|-id=044 bgcolor=#fefefe
| 369044 ||  || — || February 2, 2008 || Kitt Peak || Spacewatch || — || align=right data-sort-value="0.74" | 740 m || 
|-id=045 bgcolor=#d6d6d6
| 369045 ||  || — || October 22, 2006 || Mount Lemmon || Mount Lemmon Survey || KOR || align=right | 1.6 km || 
|-id=046 bgcolor=#fefefe
| 369046 ||  || — || February 2, 2008 || Kitt Peak || Spacewatch || — || align=right data-sort-value="0.87" | 870 m || 
|-id=047 bgcolor=#fefefe
| 369047 ||  || — || February 7, 2008 || Mount Lemmon || Mount Lemmon Survey || V || align=right data-sort-value="0.74" | 740 m || 
|-id=048 bgcolor=#E9E9E9
| 369048 ||  || — || January 30, 2008 || Mount Lemmon || Mount Lemmon Survey || — || align=right data-sort-value="0.98" | 980 m || 
|-id=049 bgcolor=#fefefe
| 369049 ||  || — || January 30, 2008 || Catalina || CSS || — || align=right | 1.2 km || 
|-id=050 bgcolor=#fefefe
| 369050 ||  || — || February 2, 2008 || Kitt Peak || Spacewatch || — || align=right data-sort-value="0.93" | 930 m || 
|-id=051 bgcolor=#fefefe
| 369051 ||  || — || February 13, 2008 || Catalina || CSS || V || align=right data-sort-value="0.93" | 930 m || 
|-id=052 bgcolor=#E9E9E9
| 369052 ||  || — || February 8, 2008 || Siding Spring || SSS || — || align=right | 2.3 km || 
|-id=053 bgcolor=#fefefe
| 369053 ||  || — || February 12, 2008 || Mount Lemmon || Mount Lemmon Survey || — || align=right | 1.3 km || 
|-id=054 bgcolor=#fefefe
| 369054 ||  || — || February 8, 2008 || Kitt Peak || Spacewatch || V || align=right data-sort-value="0.68" | 680 m || 
|-id=055 bgcolor=#E9E9E9
| 369055 ||  || — || February 11, 2008 || Mount Lemmon || Mount Lemmon Survey || — || align=right data-sort-value="0.92" | 920 m || 
|-id=056 bgcolor=#fefefe
| 369056 ||  || — || February 2, 2008 || Kitt Peak || Spacewatch || — || align=right | 1.1 km || 
|-id=057 bgcolor=#FFC2E0
| 369057 ||  || — || February 28, 2008 || Catalina || CSS || APOPHAcritical || align=right data-sort-value="0.20" | 200 m || 
|-id=058 bgcolor=#E9E9E9
| 369058 ||  || — || February 27, 2008 || Kitt Peak || Spacewatch || — || align=right | 1.5 km || 
|-id=059 bgcolor=#E9E9E9
| 369059 ||  || — || February 29, 2008 || Kitt Peak || Spacewatch || critical || align=right data-sort-value="0.94" | 940 m || 
|-id=060 bgcolor=#E9E9E9
| 369060 ||  || — || February 28, 2008 || Catalina || CSS || — || align=right | 1.4 km || 
|-id=061 bgcolor=#fefefe
| 369061 ||  || — || March 4, 2008 || Kitt Peak || Spacewatch || V || align=right data-sort-value="0.56" | 560 m || 
|-id=062 bgcolor=#E9E9E9
| 369062 ||  || — || March 4, 2008 || Mount Lemmon || Mount Lemmon Survey || — || align=right | 1.4 km || 
|-id=063 bgcolor=#E9E9E9
| 369063 ||  || — || March 1, 2008 || Kitt Peak || Spacewatch || GER || align=right | 1.4 km || 
|-id=064 bgcolor=#fefefe
| 369064 ||  || — || March 4, 2008 || Kitt Peak || Spacewatch || — || align=right data-sort-value="0.67" | 670 m || 
|-id=065 bgcolor=#E9E9E9
| 369065 ||  || — || March 5, 2008 || Kitt Peak || Spacewatch || — || align=right | 1.0 km || 
|-id=066 bgcolor=#E9E9E9
| 369066 ||  || — || March 4, 2008 || Kitt Peak || Spacewatch || — || align=right | 2.2 km || 
|-id=067 bgcolor=#E9E9E9
| 369067 ||  || — || March 10, 2008 || Mount Lemmon || Mount Lemmon Survey || — || align=right | 3.3 km || 
|-id=068 bgcolor=#fefefe
| 369068 ||  || — || March 9, 2008 || Kitt Peak || Spacewatch || — || align=right | 1.1 km || 
|-id=069 bgcolor=#fefefe
| 369069 ||  || — || March 1, 2008 || Kitt Peak || Spacewatch || — || align=right data-sort-value="0.90" | 900 m || 
|-id=070 bgcolor=#E9E9E9
| 369070 ||  || — || March 5, 2008 || Kitt Peak || Spacewatch || — || align=right data-sort-value="0.78" | 780 m || 
|-id=071 bgcolor=#E9E9E9
| 369071 ||  || — || October 6, 2005 || Mount Lemmon || Mount Lemmon Survey || — || align=right data-sort-value="0.93" | 930 m || 
|-id=072 bgcolor=#E9E9E9
| 369072 ||  || — || March 27, 2008 || Kitt Peak || Spacewatch || — || align=right | 2.4 km || 
|-id=073 bgcolor=#E9E9E9
| 369073 ||  || — || March 28, 2008 || Mount Lemmon || Mount Lemmon Survey || — || align=right | 1.7 km || 
|-id=074 bgcolor=#E9E9E9
| 369074 ||  || — || February 28, 2008 || Kitt Peak || Spacewatch || KON || align=right | 2.0 km || 
|-id=075 bgcolor=#fefefe
| 369075 ||  || — || March 5, 2008 || Mount Lemmon || Mount Lemmon Survey || LCI || align=right | 1.1 km || 
|-id=076 bgcolor=#fefefe
| 369076 ||  || — || March 10, 2008 || Kitt Peak || Spacewatch || — || align=right data-sort-value="0.99" | 990 m || 
|-id=077 bgcolor=#fefefe
| 369077 ||  || — || March 27, 2008 || Mount Lemmon || Mount Lemmon Survey || — || align=right | 1.3 km || 
|-id=078 bgcolor=#E9E9E9
| 369078 ||  || — || March 4, 2008 || Mount Lemmon || Mount Lemmon Survey || MAR || align=right | 1.3 km || 
|-id=079 bgcolor=#E9E9E9
| 369079 ||  || — || March 30, 2008 || Kitt Peak || Spacewatch || JUN || align=right | 1.2 km || 
|-id=080 bgcolor=#E9E9E9
| 369080 ||  || — || March 30, 2008 || Kitt Peak || Spacewatch || — || align=right | 2.2 km || 
|-id=081 bgcolor=#E9E9E9
| 369081 ||  || — || March 31, 2008 || Kitt Peak || Spacewatch || BRG || align=right | 1.5 km || 
|-id=082 bgcolor=#E9E9E9
| 369082 ||  || — || March 31, 2008 || Kitt Peak || Spacewatch || — || align=right | 1.9 km || 
|-id=083 bgcolor=#E9E9E9
| 369083 ||  || — || March 31, 2008 || Mount Lemmon || Mount Lemmon Survey || — || align=right | 1.3 km || 
|-id=084 bgcolor=#fefefe
| 369084 ||  || — || March 27, 2008 || Mount Lemmon || Mount Lemmon Survey || V || align=right | 1.1 km || 
|-id=085 bgcolor=#E9E9E9
| 369085 ||  || — || April 8, 2008 || Desert Eagle || W. K. Y. Yeung || — || align=right | 2.0 km || 
|-id=086 bgcolor=#E9E9E9
| 369086 ||  || — || April 3, 2008 || Kitt Peak || Spacewatch || — || align=right data-sort-value="0.98" | 980 m || 
|-id=087 bgcolor=#E9E9E9
| 369087 ||  || — || April 4, 2008 || Kitt Peak || Spacewatch || — || align=right | 1.2 km || 
|-id=088 bgcolor=#E9E9E9
| 369088 Marcus ||  ||  || March 12, 2008 || La Silla || EURONEAR || — || align=right | 1.2 km || 
|-id=089 bgcolor=#fefefe
| 369089 ||  || — || April 6, 2008 || Kitt Peak || Spacewatch || — || align=right | 1.3 km || 
|-id=090 bgcolor=#E9E9E9
| 369090 ||  || — || April 6, 2008 || Mount Lemmon || Mount Lemmon Survey || — || align=right | 3.2 km || 
|-id=091 bgcolor=#E9E9E9
| 369091 ||  || — || March 28, 2008 || Mount Lemmon || Mount Lemmon Survey || — || align=right data-sort-value="0.97" | 970 m || 
|-id=092 bgcolor=#E9E9E9
| 369092 ||  || — || April 6, 2008 || Mount Lemmon || Mount Lemmon Survey || JUN || align=right | 1.2 km || 
|-id=093 bgcolor=#E9E9E9
| 369093 ||  || — || March 28, 2008 || Kitt Peak || Spacewatch || — || align=right | 1.3 km || 
|-id=094 bgcolor=#E9E9E9
| 369094 ||  || — || March 29, 2008 || Kitt Peak || Spacewatch || — || align=right | 1.9 km || 
|-id=095 bgcolor=#d6d6d6
| 369095 ||  || — || October 22, 2005 || Catalina || CSS || EOS || align=right | 2.0 km || 
|-id=096 bgcolor=#E9E9E9
| 369096 ||  || — || April 13, 2008 || Kitt Peak || Spacewatch || JUN || align=right | 1.1 km || 
|-id=097 bgcolor=#fefefe
| 369097 ||  || — || December 16, 2007 || Mount Lemmon || Mount Lemmon Survey || — || align=right data-sort-value="0.89" | 890 m || 
|-id=098 bgcolor=#E9E9E9
| 369098 ||  || — || April 6, 2008 || Kitt Peak || Spacewatch || EUN || align=right | 1.2 km || 
|-id=099 bgcolor=#E9E9E9
| 369099 ||  || — || April 6, 2008 || Kitt Peak || Spacewatch || — || align=right | 1.6 km || 
|-id=100 bgcolor=#E9E9E9
| 369100 ||  || — || April 4, 2008 || Mount Lemmon || Mount Lemmon Survey || EUN || align=right | 1.4 km || 
|}

369101–369200 

|-bgcolor=#E9E9E9
| 369101 ||  || — || April 24, 2008 || Catalina || CSS || — || align=right | 1.4 km || 
|-id=102 bgcolor=#E9E9E9
| 369102 ||  || — || April 15, 2008 || Mount Lemmon || Mount Lemmon Survey || — || align=right | 1.2 km || 
|-id=103 bgcolor=#E9E9E9
| 369103 ||  || — || April 27, 2008 || Mount Lemmon || Mount Lemmon Survey || EUN || align=right | 1.2 km || 
|-id=104 bgcolor=#E9E9E9
| 369104 ||  || — || April 28, 2008 || Kitt Peak || Spacewatch || — || align=right | 2.5 km || 
|-id=105 bgcolor=#E9E9E9
| 369105 ||  || — || April 29, 2008 || Kitt Peak || Spacewatch || AER || align=right | 1.3 km || 
|-id=106 bgcolor=#E9E9E9
| 369106 ||  || — || March 28, 2008 || Mount Lemmon || Mount Lemmon Survey || KRM || align=right | 2.2 km || 
|-id=107 bgcolor=#E9E9E9
| 369107 ||  || — || May 3, 2008 || Kitt Peak || Spacewatch || — || align=right | 2.5 km || 
|-id=108 bgcolor=#E9E9E9
| 369108 ||  || — || May 3, 2008 || Cerro Burek || Alianza S4 Obs. || MAR || align=right | 1.2 km || 
|-id=109 bgcolor=#E9E9E9
| 369109 ||  || — || May 3, 2008 || Kitt Peak || Spacewatch || MAR || align=right | 1.3 km || 
|-id=110 bgcolor=#E9E9E9
| 369110 ||  || — || October 8, 2005 || Kitt Peak || Spacewatch || — || align=right | 1.3 km || 
|-id=111 bgcolor=#E9E9E9
| 369111 ||  || — || May 30, 2008 || Kitt Peak || Spacewatch || — || align=right | 1.4 km || 
|-id=112 bgcolor=#d6d6d6
| 369112 ||  || — || July 6, 2008 || Antares || ARO || — || align=right | 3.9 km || 
|-id=113 bgcolor=#d6d6d6
| 369113 ||  || — || July 26, 2008 || Siding Spring || SSS || FIR || align=right | 3.8 km || 
|-id=114 bgcolor=#d6d6d6
| 369114 ||  || — || July 29, 2008 || Kitt Peak || Spacewatch || — || align=right | 2.2 km || 
|-id=115 bgcolor=#d6d6d6
| 369115 ||  || — || July 29, 2008 || Kitt Peak || Spacewatch || KOR || align=right | 1.6 km || 
|-id=116 bgcolor=#d6d6d6
| 369116 ||  || — || August 11, 2008 || Sandlot || G. Hug || — || align=right | 3.2 km || 
|-id=117 bgcolor=#d6d6d6
| 369117 ||  || — || August 25, 2008 || Dauban || F. Kugel || — || align=right | 4.0 km || 
|-id=118 bgcolor=#d6d6d6
| 369118 ||  || — || August 26, 2008 || La Sagra || OAM Obs. || — || align=right | 2.5 km || 
|-id=119 bgcolor=#d6d6d6
| 369119 ||  || — || August 26, 2008 || La Sagra || OAM Obs. || — || align=right | 5.0 km || 
|-id=120 bgcolor=#d6d6d6
| 369120 ||  || — || August 27, 2008 || La Sagra || OAM Obs. || — || align=right | 3.4 km || 
|-id=121 bgcolor=#d6d6d6
| 369121 ||  || — || August 21, 2008 || Kitt Peak || Spacewatch || EOS || align=right | 1.9 km || 
|-id=122 bgcolor=#d6d6d6
| 369122 ||  || — || August 24, 2008 || Kitt Peak || Spacewatch || — || align=right | 2.5 km || 
|-id=123 bgcolor=#d6d6d6
| 369123 ||  || — || August 29, 2008 || La Sagra || OAM Obs. || — || align=right | 4.0 km || 
|-id=124 bgcolor=#d6d6d6
| 369124 ||  || — || September 2, 2008 || Kitt Peak || Spacewatch || EOS || align=right | 1.9 km || 
|-id=125 bgcolor=#d6d6d6
| 369125 ||  || — || September 2, 2008 || Kitt Peak || Spacewatch || EOS || align=right | 1.9 km || 
|-id=126 bgcolor=#d6d6d6
| 369126 ||  || — || September 3, 2008 || Kitt Peak || Spacewatch || — || align=right | 4.3 km || 
|-id=127 bgcolor=#d6d6d6
| 369127 ||  || — || September 3, 2008 || Kitt Peak || Spacewatch || 627 || align=right | 3.6 km || 
|-id=128 bgcolor=#d6d6d6
| 369128 ||  || — || August 23, 2008 || Kitt Peak || Spacewatch || — || align=right | 3.1 km || 
|-id=129 bgcolor=#d6d6d6
| 369129 ||  || — || May 2, 2006 || Mount Lemmon || Mount Lemmon Survey || — || align=right | 3.3 km || 
|-id=130 bgcolor=#d6d6d6
| 369130 ||  || — || September 2, 2008 || Kitt Peak || Spacewatch || — || align=right | 2.4 km || 
|-id=131 bgcolor=#d6d6d6
| 369131 ||  || — || September 2, 2008 || Kitt Peak || Spacewatch || — || align=right | 3.1 km || 
|-id=132 bgcolor=#d6d6d6
| 369132 ||  || — || August 22, 2008 || Kitt Peak || Spacewatch || — || align=right | 2.8 km || 
|-id=133 bgcolor=#d6d6d6
| 369133 ||  || — || July 29, 2008 || Mount Lemmon || Mount Lemmon Survey || — || align=right | 3.3 km || 
|-id=134 bgcolor=#d6d6d6
| 369134 Mariareiche ||  ||  || September 8, 2008 || Taunus || E. Schwab, U. Zimmer || — || align=right | 2.3 km || 
|-id=135 bgcolor=#d6d6d6
| 369135 ||  || — || September 4, 2008 || Kitt Peak || Spacewatch || — || align=right | 2.0 km || 
|-id=136 bgcolor=#d6d6d6
| 369136 ||  || — || September 5, 2008 || Kitt Peak || Spacewatch || — || align=right | 3.3 km || 
|-id=137 bgcolor=#d6d6d6
| 369137 ||  || — || September 5, 2008 || Kitt Peak || Spacewatch || — || align=right | 4.0 km || 
|-id=138 bgcolor=#d6d6d6
| 369138 ||  || — || September 6, 2008 || Kitt Peak || Spacewatch || — || align=right | 3.3 km || 
|-id=139 bgcolor=#d6d6d6
| 369139 ||  || — || September 3, 2008 || Kitt Peak || Spacewatch || — || align=right | 2.6 km || 
|-id=140 bgcolor=#d6d6d6
| 369140 ||  || — || September 4, 2008 || Kitt Peak || Spacewatch || VER || align=right | 2.5 km || 
|-id=141 bgcolor=#d6d6d6
| 369141 ||  || — || August 19, 2002 || Palomar || NEAT || — || align=right | 5.0 km || 
|-id=142 bgcolor=#d6d6d6
| 369142 ||  || — || September 3, 2008 || Kitt Peak || Spacewatch || EOS || align=right | 1.8 km || 
|-id=143 bgcolor=#d6d6d6
| 369143 ||  || — || September 4, 2008 || Socorro || LINEAR || — || align=right | 4.3 km || 
|-id=144 bgcolor=#d6d6d6
| 369144 ||  || — || September 4, 2008 || Kitt Peak || Spacewatch || — || align=right | 2.5 km || 
|-id=145 bgcolor=#d6d6d6
| 369145 ||  || — || September 5, 2008 || Socorro || LINEAR || — || align=right | 3.4 km || 
|-id=146 bgcolor=#d6d6d6
| 369146 ||  || — || October 27, 2003 || Kitt Peak || Spacewatch || — || align=right | 3.8 km || 
|-id=147 bgcolor=#d6d6d6
| 369147 ||  || — || September 4, 2008 || Socorro || LINEAR || NAE || align=right | 3.4 km || 
|-id=148 bgcolor=#d6d6d6
| 369148 ||  || — || September 2, 2008 || Kitt Peak || Spacewatch || TIR || align=right | 2.4 km || 
|-id=149 bgcolor=#d6d6d6
| 369149 ||  || — || September 20, 2008 || Kitt Peak || Spacewatch || — || align=right | 3.3 km || 
|-id=150 bgcolor=#d6d6d6
| 369150 ||  || — || September 20, 2008 || Kitt Peak || Spacewatch || — || align=right | 3.5 km || 
|-id=151 bgcolor=#d6d6d6
| 369151 ||  || — || September 20, 2008 || Kitt Peak || Spacewatch || — || align=right | 3.4 km || 
|-id=152 bgcolor=#d6d6d6
| 369152 ||  || — || September 20, 2008 || Mount Lemmon || Mount Lemmon Survey || — || align=right | 2.9 km || 
|-id=153 bgcolor=#d6d6d6
| 369153 ||  || — || September 20, 2008 || Mount Lemmon || Mount Lemmon Survey || HYG || align=right | 4.0 km || 
|-id=154 bgcolor=#d6d6d6
| 369154 ||  || — || September 20, 2008 || Catalina || CSS || — || align=right | 2.3 km || 
|-id=155 bgcolor=#d6d6d6
| 369155 ||  || — || September 21, 2008 || Kitt Peak || Spacewatch || — || align=right | 3.2 km || 
|-id=156 bgcolor=#d6d6d6
| 369156 ||  || — || September 6, 2008 || Mount Lemmon || Mount Lemmon Survey || — || align=right | 2.9 km || 
|-id=157 bgcolor=#d6d6d6
| 369157 ||  || — || September 21, 2008 || Kitt Peak || Spacewatch || HYG || align=right | 3.7 km || 
|-id=158 bgcolor=#d6d6d6
| 369158 ||  || — || September 3, 2008 || Kitt Peak || Spacewatch || — || align=right | 3.9 km || 
|-id=159 bgcolor=#d6d6d6
| 369159 ||  || — || September 20, 2008 || Kitt Peak || Spacewatch || — || align=right | 3.1 km || 
|-id=160 bgcolor=#d6d6d6
| 369160 ||  || — || September 21, 2008 || Kitt Peak || Spacewatch || HYG || align=right | 2.3 km || 
|-id=161 bgcolor=#d6d6d6
| 369161 ||  || — || September 21, 2008 || Kitt Peak || Spacewatch || — || align=right | 3.2 km || 
|-id=162 bgcolor=#d6d6d6
| 369162 ||  || — || September 21, 2008 || Kitt Peak || Spacewatch || — || align=right | 3.0 km || 
|-id=163 bgcolor=#d6d6d6
| 369163 ||  || — || September 21, 2008 || Kitt Peak || Spacewatch || CHA || align=right | 2.3 km || 
|-id=164 bgcolor=#d6d6d6
| 369164 ||  || — || September 22, 2008 || Kitt Peak || Spacewatch || KOR || align=right | 1.7 km || 
|-id=165 bgcolor=#d6d6d6
| 369165 ||  || — || September 22, 2008 || Kitt Peak || Spacewatch || — || align=right | 2.8 km || 
|-id=166 bgcolor=#d6d6d6
| 369166 ||  || — || September 22, 2008 || Kitt Peak || Spacewatch || THM || align=right | 2.3 km || 
|-id=167 bgcolor=#d6d6d6
| 369167 ||  || — || September 22, 2008 || Kitt Peak || Spacewatch || EOS || align=right | 2.2 km || 
|-id=168 bgcolor=#d6d6d6
| 369168 ||  || — || September 22, 2008 || Kitt Peak || Spacewatch || — || align=right | 2.9 km || 
|-id=169 bgcolor=#d6d6d6
| 369169 ||  || — || September 22, 2008 || Kitt Peak || Spacewatch || — || align=right | 3.4 km || 
|-id=170 bgcolor=#d6d6d6
| 369170 ||  || — || September 22, 2008 || Kitt Peak || Spacewatch || — || align=right | 3.0 km || 
|-id=171 bgcolor=#d6d6d6
| 369171 ||  || — || September 24, 2008 || Kitt Peak || Spacewatch || — || align=right | 2.5 km || 
|-id=172 bgcolor=#d6d6d6
| 369172 ||  || — || September 24, 2008 || Mount Lemmon || Mount Lemmon Survey || EOS || align=right | 2.0 km || 
|-id=173 bgcolor=#d6d6d6
| 369173 ||  || — || September 23, 2008 || Kitt Peak || Spacewatch || — || align=right | 3.6 km || 
|-id=174 bgcolor=#d6d6d6
| 369174 ||  || — || September 23, 2008 || Kitt Peak || Spacewatch || — || align=right | 3.2 km || 
|-id=175 bgcolor=#d6d6d6
| 369175 ||  || — || September 28, 2008 || Socorro || LINEAR || — || align=right | 3.2 km || 
|-id=176 bgcolor=#d6d6d6
| 369176 ||  || — || September 21, 2008 || Mount Lemmon || Mount Lemmon Survey || — || align=right | 2.8 km || 
|-id=177 bgcolor=#d6d6d6
| 369177 ||  || — || September 21, 2008 || Mount Lemmon || Mount Lemmon Survey || — || align=right | 3.7 km || 
|-id=178 bgcolor=#d6d6d6
| 369178 ||  || — || September 22, 2008 || Catalina || CSS || — || align=right | 4.6 km || 
|-id=179 bgcolor=#d6d6d6
| 369179 ||  || — || September 23, 2008 || Kitt Peak || Spacewatch || — || align=right | 3.9 km || 
|-id=180 bgcolor=#d6d6d6
| 369180 ||  || — || September 25, 2008 || Kitt Peak || Spacewatch || VER || align=right | 2.9 km || 
|-id=181 bgcolor=#d6d6d6
| 369181 ||  || — || September 26, 2008 || Kitt Peak || Spacewatch || — || align=right | 3.0 km || 
|-id=182 bgcolor=#d6d6d6
| 369182 ||  || — || September 27, 2008 || Mount Lemmon || Mount Lemmon Survey || EOS || align=right | 2.0 km || 
|-id=183 bgcolor=#d6d6d6
| 369183 ||  || — || September 30, 2008 || La Sagra || OAM Obs. || LIX || align=right | 4.2 km || 
|-id=184 bgcolor=#d6d6d6
| 369184 ||  || — || October 23, 2003 || Kitt Peak || Spacewatch || — || align=right | 2.0 km || 
|-id=185 bgcolor=#d6d6d6
| 369185 ||  || — || September 28, 2008 || Catalina || CSS || — || align=right | 3.8 km || 
|-id=186 bgcolor=#d6d6d6
| 369186 ||  || — || September 23, 2008 || Kitt Peak || Spacewatch || — || align=right | 3.1 km || 
|-id=187 bgcolor=#d6d6d6
| 369187 ||  || — || September 30, 2008 || Catalina || CSS || — || align=right | 2.9 km || 
|-id=188 bgcolor=#d6d6d6
| 369188 ||  || — || September 23, 2008 || Catalina || CSS || — || align=right | 6.8 km || 
|-id=189 bgcolor=#d6d6d6
| 369189 ||  || — || September 21, 2008 || Kitt Peak || Spacewatch || HYG || align=right | 3.0 km || 
|-id=190 bgcolor=#d6d6d6
| 369190 ||  || — || September 19, 2003 || Kitt Peak || Spacewatch || — || align=right | 2.9 km || 
|-id=191 bgcolor=#d6d6d6
| 369191 ||  || — || October 1, 2008 || Mount Lemmon || Mount Lemmon Survey || — || align=right | 3.6 km || 
|-id=192 bgcolor=#d6d6d6
| 369192 ||  || — || October 1, 2008 || Kitt Peak || Spacewatch || — || align=right | 3.5 km || 
|-id=193 bgcolor=#d6d6d6
| 369193 ||  || — || September 20, 2008 || Kitt Peak || Spacewatch || — || align=right | 3.1 km || 
|-id=194 bgcolor=#d6d6d6
| 369194 ||  || — || October 2, 2008 || Kitt Peak || Spacewatch || — || align=right | 5.0 km || 
|-id=195 bgcolor=#d6d6d6
| 369195 ||  || — || October 2, 2008 || Kitt Peak || Spacewatch || — || align=right | 2.7 km || 
|-id=196 bgcolor=#d6d6d6
| 369196 ||  || — || October 2, 2008 || Catalina || CSS || — || align=right | 4.9 km || 
|-id=197 bgcolor=#d6d6d6
| 369197 ||  || — || October 2, 2008 || Catalina || CSS || — || align=right | 3.0 km || 
|-id=198 bgcolor=#d6d6d6
| 369198 ||  || — || October 5, 2008 || La Sagra || OAM Obs. || — || align=right | 3.1 km || 
|-id=199 bgcolor=#d6d6d6
| 369199 ||  || — || October 6, 2008 || Kitt Peak || Spacewatch || — || align=right | 2.7 km || 
|-id=200 bgcolor=#d6d6d6
| 369200 ||  || — || October 6, 2008 || Kitt Peak || Spacewatch || — || align=right | 2.6 km || 
|}

369201–369300 

|-bgcolor=#d6d6d6
| 369201 ||  || — || October 6, 2008 || Catalina || CSS || — || align=right | 4.1 km || 
|-id=202 bgcolor=#d6d6d6
| 369202 ||  || — || October 8, 2008 || Kitt Peak || Spacewatch || — || align=right | 2.9 km || 
|-id=203 bgcolor=#d6d6d6
| 369203 ||  || — || March 20, 2001 || Kitt Peak || Spacewatch || — || align=right | 2.7 km || 
|-id=204 bgcolor=#d6d6d6
| 369204 ||  || — || October 9, 2008 || Mount Lemmon || Mount Lemmon Survey || — || align=right | 3.0 km || 
|-id=205 bgcolor=#d6d6d6
| 369205 ||  || — || October 1, 2008 || Mount Lemmon || Mount Lemmon Survey || — || align=right | 2.4 km || 
|-id=206 bgcolor=#d6d6d6
| 369206 ||  || — || October 6, 2008 || Catalina || CSS || — || align=right | 4.6 km || 
|-id=207 bgcolor=#d6d6d6
| 369207 ||  || — || October 6, 2008 || Catalina || CSS || — || align=right | 3.6 km || 
|-id=208 bgcolor=#d6d6d6
| 369208 ||  || — || October 2, 2008 || Catalina || CSS || — || align=right | 3.0 km || 
|-id=209 bgcolor=#d6d6d6
| 369209 ||  || — || October 9, 2008 || Socorro || LINEAR || TIR || align=right | 3.3 km || 
|-id=210 bgcolor=#d6d6d6
| 369210 ||  || — || October 8, 2008 || Mount Lemmon || Mount Lemmon Survey || — || align=right | 2.9 km || 
|-id=211 bgcolor=#d6d6d6
| 369211 ||  || — || October 17, 2008 || Kitt Peak || Spacewatch || HYG || align=right | 2.3 km || 
|-id=212 bgcolor=#d6d6d6
| 369212 ||  || — || October 17, 2008 || Kitt Peak || Spacewatch || — || align=right | 2.9 km || 
|-id=213 bgcolor=#d6d6d6
| 369213 ||  || — || October 19, 2008 || Kitt Peak || Spacewatch || — || align=right | 3.3 km || 
|-id=214 bgcolor=#d6d6d6
| 369214 ||  || — || October 20, 2008 || Mount Lemmon || Mount Lemmon Survey || — || align=right | 4.0 km || 
|-id=215 bgcolor=#d6d6d6
| 369215 ||  || — || October 21, 2008 || Mount Lemmon || Mount Lemmon Survey || — || align=right | 3.0 km || 
|-id=216 bgcolor=#d6d6d6
| 369216 ||  || — || October 21, 2008 || Kitt Peak || Spacewatch || — || align=right | 2.5 km || 
|-id=217 bgcolor=#d6d6d6
| 369217 ||  || — || October 21, 2008 || Kitt Peak || Spacewatch || — || align=right | 2.9 km || 
|-id=218 bgcolor=#d6d6d6
| 369218 ||  || — || October 22, 2008 || Kitt Peak || Spacewatch || — || align=right | 4.1 km || 
|-id=219 bgcolor=#d6d6d6
| 369219 ||  || — || October 8, 2008 || Catalina || CSS || — || align=right | 4.1 km || 
|-id=220 bgcolor=#d6d6d6
| 369220 ||  || — || October 20, 2008 || Kitt Peak || Spacewatch || — || align=right | 3.0 km || 
|-id=221 bgcolor=#d6d6d6
| 369221 ||  || — || October 21, 2008 || Kitt Peak || Spacewatch || — || align=right | 3.5 km || 
|-id=222 bgcolor=#d6d6d6
| 369222 ||  || — || October 22, 2008 || Kitt Peak || Spacewatch || HYG || align=right | 3.2 km || 
|-id=223 bgcolor=#d6d6d6
| 369223 ||  || — || October 22, 2008 || Kitt Peak || Spacewatch || HYG || align=right | 3.1 km || 
|-id=224 bgcolor=#d6d6d6
| 369224 ||  || — || October 23, 2008 || Kitt Peak || Spacewatch || — || align=right | 3.3 km || 
|-id=225 bgcolor=#d6d6d6
| 369225 ||  || — || October 23, 2008 || Mount Lemmon || Mount Lemmon Survey || — || align=right | 3.0 km || 
|-id=226 bgcolor=#d6d6d6
| 369226 ||  || — || October 23, 2008 || Črni Vrh || Črni Vrh || — || align=right | 5.6 km || 
|-id=227 bgcolor=#d6d6d6
| 369227 ||  || — || October 23, 2008 || Kitt Peak || Spacewatch || — || align=right | 3.2 km || 
|-id=228 bgcolor=#d6d6d6
| 369228 ||  || — || October 24, 2008 || Catalina || CSS || — || align=right | 3.4 km || 
|-id=229 bgcolor=#d6d6d6
| 369229 ||  || — || October 25, 2008 || Catalina || CSS || — || align=right | 4.7 km || 
|-id=230 bgcolor=#d6d6d6
| 369230 ||  || — || October 27, 2008 || Mount Lemmon || Mount Lemmon Survey || — || align=right | 3.3 km || 
|-id=231 bgcolor=#d6d6d6
| 369231 ||  || — || May 6, 2006 || Mount Lemmon || Mount Lemmon Survey || SYL7:4 || align=right | 3.5 km || 
|-id=232 bgcolor=#d6d6d6
| 369232 ||  || — || October 28, 2008 || Mount Lemmon || Mount Lemmon Survey || — || align=right | 2.4 km || 
|-id=233 bgcolor=#d6d6d6
| 369233 ||  || — || October 30, 2008 || Catalina || CSS || — || align=right | 2.7 km || 
|-id=234 bgcolor=#d6d6d6
| 369234 ||  || — || October 31, 2008 || Mount Lemmon || Mount Lemmon Survey || — || align=right | 2.8 km || 
|-id=235 bgcolor=#d6d6d6
| 369235 ||  || — || October 23, 2008 || Kitt Peak || Spacewatch || THM || align=right | 2.6 km || 
|-id=236 bgcolor=#d6d6d6
| 369236 ||  || — || December 4, 2003 || Socorro || LINEAR || — || align=right | 4.2 km || 
|-id=237 bgcolor=#d6d6d6
| 369237 ||  || — || October 30, 2008 || Catalina || CSS || EUP || align=right | 7.5 km || 
|-id=238 bgcolor=#d6d6d6
| 369238 ||  || — || November 2, 2008 || Socorro || LINEAR || LIX || align=right | 5.0 km || 
|-id=239 bgcolor=#d6d6d6
| 369239 ||  || — || November 1, 2008 || Kitt Peak || Spacewatch || HYG || align=right | 4.3 km || 
|-id=240 bgcolor=#d6d6d6
| 369240 ||  || — || November 18, 2008 || Catalina || CSS || LIX || align=right | 4.3 km || 
|-id=241 bgcolor=#d6d6d6
| 369241 ||  || — || November 18, 2008 || Catalina || CSS || — || align=right | 3.3 km || 
|-id=242 bgcolor=#d6d6d6
| 369242 ||  || — || November 18, 2008 || Catalina || CSS || — || align=right | 4.2 km || 
|-id=243 bgcolor=#d6d6d6
| 369243 ||  || — || November 18, 2008 || Kitt Peak || Spacewatch || — || align=right | 3.4 km || 
|-id=244 bgcolor=#d6d6d6
| 369244 ||  || — || November 25, 2008 || Dauban || F. Kugel || — || align=right | 6.8 km || 
|-id=245 bgcolor=#d6d6d6
| 369245 ||  || — || November 29, 2008 || Mayhill || A. Lowe || — || align=right | 2.9 km || 
|-id=246 bgcolor=#d6d6d6
| 369246 ||  || — || December 4, 2008 || Socorro || LINEAR || — || align=right | 3.5 km || 
|-id=247 bgcolor=#fefefe
| 369247 ||  || — || December 29, 2008 || Mount Lemmon || Mount Lemmon Survey || — || align=right | 1.1 km || 
|-id=248 bgcolor=#fefefe
| 369248 ||  || — || February 13, 2009 || Kitt Peak || Spacewatch || FLO || align=right data-sort-value="0.87" | 870 m || 
|-id=249 bgcolor=#fefefe
| 369249 ||  || — || February 1, 2009 || Catalina || CSS || — || align=right | 1.0 km || 
|-id=250 bgcolor=#fefefe
| 369250 ||  || — || May 2, 2006 || Mount Lemmon || Mount Lemmon Survey || — || align=right data-sort-value="0.57" | 570 m || 
|-id=251 bgcolor=#fefefe
| 369251 ||  || — || February 27, 2009 || Catalina || CSS || H || align=right data-sort-value="0.71" | 710 m || 
|-id=252 bgcolor=#fefefe
| 369252 ||  || — || January 2, 2009 || Kitt Peak || Spacewatch || — || align=right data-sort-value="0.82" | 820 m || 
|-id=253 bgcolor=#fefefe
| 369253 ||  || — || March 3, 2009 || Mount Lemmon || Mount Lemmon Survey || — || align=right data-sort-value="0.52" | 520 m || 
|-id=254 bgcolor=#fefefe
| 369254 ||  || — || March 18, 2009 || Kitt Peak || Spacewatch || — || align=right data-sort-value="0.74" | 740 m || 
|-id=255 bgcolor=#fefefe
| 369255 ||  || — || March 28, 2009 || Kitt Peak || Spacewatch || FLO || align=right data-sort-value="0.60" | 600 m || 
|-id=256 bgcolor=#fefefe
| 369256 ||  || — || April 20, 2009 || Kitt Peak || Spacewatch || FLO || align=right data-sort-value="0.60" | 600 m || 
|-id=257 bgcolor=#fefefe
| 369257 ||  || — || April 23, 2009 || Catalina || CSS || PHO || align=right | 1.1 km || 
|-id=258 bgcolor=#E9E9E9
| 369258 ||  || — || April 27, 2009 || Mount Lemmon || Mount Lemmon Survey || — || align=right | 2.0 km || 
|-id=259 bgcolor=#E9E9E9
| 369259 ||  || — || April 30, 2009 || Kitt Peak || Spacewatch || — || align=right | 1.5 km || 
|-id=260 bgcolor=#fefefe
| 369260 ||  || — || May 4, 2009 || Mount Lemmon || Mount Lemmon Survey || FLO || align=right data-sort-value="0.67" | 670 m || 
|-id=261 bgcolor=#fefefe
| 369261 ||  || — || May 16, 2009 || La Sagra || OAM Obs. || — || align=right data-sort-value="0.89" | 890 m || 
|-id=262 bgcolor=#fefefe
| 369262 ||  || — || March 19, 2009 || Mount Lemmon || Mount Lemmon Survey || FLO || align=right data-sort-value="0.64" | 640 m || 
|-id=263 bgcolor=#fefefe
| 369263 ||  || — || June 12, 2009 || Kitt Peak || Spacewatch || V || align=right data-sort-value="0.70" | 700 m || 
|-id=264 bgcolor=#FFC2E0
| 369264 ||  || — || June 19, 2009 || Mount Lemmon || Mount Lemmon Survey || APO +1kmPHA || align=right | 1.5 km || 
|-id=265 bgcolor=#fefefe
| 369265 ||  || — || June 22, 2009 || Skylive Obs. || F. Tozzi || — || align=right | 2.6 km || 
|-id=266 bgcolor=#fefefe
| 369266 ||  || — || August 21, 2006 || Kitt Peak || Spacewatch || — || align=right data-sort-value="0.97" | 970 m || 
|-id=267 bgcolor=#E9E9E9
| 369267 ||  || — || July 29, 2009 || Tiki || N. Teamo || — || align=right data-sort-value="0.91" | 910 m || 
|-id=268 bgcolor=#fefefe
| 369268 ||  || — || July 21, 2009 || La Sagra || OAM Obs. || — || align=right | 1.1 km || 
|-id=269 bgcolor=#E9E9E9
| 369269 ||  || — || August 12, 2009 || La Sagra || OAM Obs. || ADE || align=right | 2.0 km || 
|-id=270 bgcolor=#E9E9E9
| 369270 ||  || — || August 15, 2009 || Kitt Peak || Spacewatch || — || align=right | 1.5 km || 
|-id=271 bgcolor=#E9E9E9
| 369271 ||  || — || August 16, 2009 || Bergisch Gladbach || W. Bickel || — || align=right | 1.0 km || 
|-id=272 bgcolor=#FA8072
| 369272 ||  || — || August 17, 2009 || Goodricke-Pigott || R. A. Tucker || — || align=right data-sort-value="0.98" | 980 m || 
|-id=273 bgcolor=#E9E9E9
| 369273 ||  || — || August 18, 2009 || Črni Vrh || Črni Vrh || RAF || align=right data-sort-value="0.99" | 990 m || 
|-id=274 bgcolor=#E9E9E9
| 369274 ||  || — || August 21, 2009 || Andrushivka || Andrushivka Obs. || GER || align=right | 1.3 km || 
|-id=275 bgcolor=#d6d6d6
| 369275 ||  || — || August 16, 2009 || Kitt Peak || Spacewatch || — || align=right | 2.6 km || 
|-id=276 bgcolor=#E9E9E9
| 369276 ||  || — || August 16, 2009 || Kitt Peak || Spacewatch || ADE || align=right | 2.6 km || 
|-id=277 bgcolor=#fefefe
| 369277 ||  || — || August 16, 2009 || Kitt Peak || Spacewatch || — || align=right | 1.0 km || 
|-id=278 bgcolor=#E9E9E9
| 369278 ||  || — || August 28, 2009 || La Sagra || OAM Obs. || — || align=right | 2.2 km || 
|-id=279 bgcolor=#E9E9E9
| 369279 ||  || — || August 30, 2009 || Taunus || S. Karge, R. Kling || — || align=right | 1.8 km || 
|-id=280 bgcolor=#E9E9E9
| 369280 ||  || — || January 27, 2007 || Mount Lemmon || Mount Lemmon Survey || WIT || align=right | 1.1 km || 
|-id=281 bgcolor=#E9E9E9
| 369281 ||  || — || August 27, 2009 || Kitt Peak || Spacewatch || — || align=right | 1.3 km || 
|-id=282 bgcolor=#E9E9E9
| 369282 ||  || — || August 27, 2009 || Črni Vrh || Črni Vrh || — || align=right | 1.4 km || 
|-id=283 bgcolor=#E9E9E9
| 369283 ||  || — || September 15, 2009 || Kitt Peak || Spacewatch || — || align=right | 3.1 km || 
|-id=284 bgcolor=#E9E9E9
| 369284 ||  || — || September 13, 2009 || ESA OGS || ESA OGS || — || align=right | 1.0 km || 
|-id=285 bgcolor=#E9E9E9
| 369285 ||  || — || September 14, 2009 || Kitt Peak || Spacewatch || — || align=right | 2.3 km || 
|-id=286 bgcolor=#E9E9E9
| 369286 ||  || — || September 14, 2009 || Kitt Peak || Spacewatch || WIT || align=right | 1.2 km || 
|-id=287 bgcolor=#E9E9E9
| 369287 ||  || — || September 14, 2009 || Kitt Peak || Spacewatch || — || align=right | 2.4 km || 
|-id=288 bgcolor=#E9E9E9
| 369288 ||  || — || October 22, 2005 || Kitt Peak || Spacewatch || PAD || align=right | 1.6 km || 
|-id=289 bgcolor=#E9E9E9
| 369289 ||  || — || September 15, 2009 || Kitt Peak || Spacewatch || — || align=right | 2.0 km || 
|-id=290 bgcolor=#E9E9E9
| 369290 ||  || — || September 15, 2009 || Kitt Peak || Spacewatch || — || align=right | 2.1 km || 
|-id=291 bgcolor=#E9E9E9
| 369291 ||  || — || September 14, 2009 || Catalina || CSS || — || align=right | 1.4 km || 
|-id=292 bgcolor=#E9E9E9
| 369292 ||  || — || September 14, 2009 || Catalina || CSS || — || align=right | 2.2 km || 
|-id=293 bgcolor=#E9E9E9
| 369293 ||  || — || September 15, 2009 || Kitt Peak || Spacewatch || WIT || align=right data-sort-value="0.99" | 990 m || 
|-id=294 bgcolor=#E9E9E9
| 369294 ||  || — || September 14, 2009 || Kitt Peak || Spacewatch || — || align=right | 1.1 km || 
|-id=295 bgcolor=#FA8072
| 369295 ||  || — || September 21, 2009 || Catalina || CSS || — || align=right data-sort-value="0.94" | 940 m || 
|-id=296 bgcolor=#FFC2E0
| 369296 ||  || — || September 18, 2009 || Mount Lemmon || Mount Lemmon Survey || APO +1km || align=right data-sort-value="0.86" | 860 m || 
|-id=297 bgcolor=#E9E9E9
| 369297 Nazca ||  ||  || September 23, 2009 || Taunus || S. Karge, E. Schwab || — || align=right | 1.6 km || 
|-id=298 bgcolor=#E9E9E9
| 369298 ||  || — || September 16, 2009 || Kitt Peak || Spacewatch || — || align=right | 1.2 km || 
|-id=299 bgcolor=#E9E9E9
| 369299 ||  || — || September 16, 2009 || Kitt Peak || Spacewatch || — || align=right | 1.5 km || 
|-id=300 bgcolor=#E9E9E9
| 369300 ||  || — || September 16, 2009 || Kitt Peak || Spacewatch || NEM || align=right | 2.3 km || 
|}

369301–369400 

|-bgcolor=#E9E9E9
| 369301 ||  || — || September 16, 2009 || Kitt Peak || Spacewatch || WIT || align=right data-sort-value="0.98" | 980 m || 
|-id=302 bgcolor=#E9E9E9
| 369302 ||  || — || November 1, 2000 || Kitt Peak || Spacewatch || — || align=right | 1.8 km || 
|-id=303 bgcolor=#E9E9E9
| 369303 ||  || — || September 16, 2009 || Kitt Peak || Spacewatch || — || align=right | 1.9 km || 
|-id=304 bgcolor=#E9E9E9
| 369304 ||  || — || September 16, 2009 || Kitt Peak || Spacewatch || — || align=right | 1.8 km || 
|-id=305 bgcolor=#d6d6d6
| 369305 ||  || — || September 16, 2009 || Kitt Peak || Spacewatch || CHA || align=right | 2.0 km || 
|-id=306 bgcolor=#E9E9E9
| 369306 ||  || — || September 16, 2009 || Kitt Peak || Spacewatch || HOF || align=right | 2.2 km || 
|-id=307 bgcolor=#E9E9E9
| 369307 ||  || — || September 16, 2009 || Kitt Peak || Spacewatch || — || align=right | 2.4 km || 
|-id=308 bgcolor=#E9E9E9
| 369308 ||  || — || September 16, 2009 || Kitt Peak || Spacewatch || — || align=right | 1.2 km || 
|-id=309 bgcolor=#E9E9E9
| 369309 ||  || — || September 17, 2009 || Kitt Peak || Spacewatch || — || align=right | 2.5 km || 
|-id=310 bgcolor=#E9E9E9
| 369310 ||  || — || September 17, 2009 || Kitt Peak || Spacewatch || DOR || align=right | 2.3 km || 
|-id=311 bgcolor=#E9E9E9
| 369311 ||  || — || September 17, 2009 || Kitt Peak || Spacewatch || — || align=right | 1.9 km || 
|-id=312 bgcolor=#E9E9E9
| 369312 ||  || — || September 18, 2009 || Mount Lemmon || Mount Lemmon Survey || — || align=right data-sort-value="0.81" | 810 m || 
|-id=313 bgcolor=#E9E9E9
| 369313 ||  || — || September 18, 2009 || Purple Mountain || PMO NEO || — || align=right data-sort-value="0.92" | 920 m || 
|-id=314 bgcolor=#E9E9E9
| 369314 ||  || — || September 18, 2009 || Catalina || CSS || — || align=right | 1.9 km || 
|-id=315 bgcolor=#E9E9E9
| 369315 ||  || — || September 23, 2009 || Taunus || S. Karge, R. Kling || — || align=right | 1.6 km || 
|-id=316 bgcolor=#E9E9E9
| 369316 ||  || — || November 6, 2005 || Mount Lemmon || Mount Lemmon Survey || — || align=right | 1.8 km || 
|-id=317 bgcolor=#E9E9E9
| 369317 ||  || — || September 18, 2009 || Kitt Peak || Spacewatch || — || align=right | 2.2 km || 
|-id=318 bgcolor=#E9E9E9
| 369318 ||  || — || September 18, 2009 || Kitt Peak || Spacewatch || — || align=right | 1.1 km || 
|-id=319 bgcolor=#E9E9E9
| 369319 ||  || — || September 18, 2009 || Kitt Peak || Spacewatch || WIT || align=right data-sort-value="0.99" | 990 m || 
|-id=320 bgcolor=#E9E9E9
| 369320 ||  || — || September 18, 2009 || Kitt Peak || Spacewatch || — || align=right | 1.4 km || 
|-id=321 bgcolor=#E9E9E9
| 369321 ||  || — || September 18, 2009 || Kitt Peak || Spacewatch || — || align=right | 1.5 km || 
|-id=322 bgcolor=#d6d6d6
| 369322 ||  || — || September 19, 2009 || Kitt Peak || Spacewatch || — || align=right | 3.7 km || 
|-id=323 bgcolor=#E9E9E9
| 369323 ||  || — || September 19, 2009 || Kitt Peak || Spacewatch || NEM || align=right | 2.4 km || 
|-id=324 bgcolor=#E9E9E9
| 369324 ||  || — || September 19, 2009 || Kitt Peak || Spacewatch || — || align=right | 1.8 km || 
|-id=325 bgcolor=#E9E9E9
| 369325 ||  || — || September 21, 2009 || Kitt Peak || Spacewatch || — || align=right | 2.2 km || 
|-id=326 bgcolor=#E9E9E9
| 369326 ||  || — || September 22, 2009 || Kitt Peak || Spacewatch || — || align=right | 1.3 km || 
|-id=327 bgcolor=#d6d6d6
| 369327 ||  || — || September 16, 2009 || Kitt Peak || Spacewatch || — || align=right | 4.1 km || 
|-id=328 bgcolor=#E9E9E9
| 369328 ||  || — || September 17, 2009 || La Sagra || OAM Obs. || — || align=right | 2.5 km || 
|-id=329 bgcolor=#E9E9E9
| 369329 ||  || — || September 23, 2009 || Kitt Peak || Spacewatch || — || align=right | 1.8 km || 
|-id=330 bgcolor=#E9E9E9
| 369330 ||  || — || August 15, 2009 || Catalina || CSS || EUN || align=right | 1.4 km || 
|-id=331 bgcolor=#E9E9E9
| 369331 ||  || — || October 23, 2005 || Catalina || CSS || BRG || align=right | 1.7 km || 
|-id=332 bgcolor=#E9E9E9
| 369332 ||  || — || September 21, 2009 || Catalina || CSS || EUN || align=right | 1.2 km || 
|-id=333 bgcolor=#E9E9E9
| 369333 ||  || — || November 30, 2005 || Kitt Peak || Spacewatch || — || align=right | 1.9 km || 
|-id=334 bgcolor=#E9E9E9
| 369334 ||  || — || September 24, 2009 || Kitt Peak || Spacewatch || NEM || align=right | 1.7 km || 
|-id=335 bgcolor=#E9E9E9
| 369335 ||  || — || December 25, 2005 || Kitt Peak || Spacewatch || — || align=right | 2.1 km || 
|-id=336 bgcolor=#E9E9E9
| 369336 ||  || — || September 25, 2009 || Catalina || CSS || — || align=right | 1.7 km || 
|-id=337 bgcolor=#E9E9E9
| 369337 ||  || — || September 26, 2009 || Kitt Peak || Spacewatch || — || align=right | 1.7 km || 
|-id=338 bgcolor=#E9E9E9
| 369338 ||  || — || September 20, 2009 || Kitt Peak || Spacewatch || HOF || align=right | 2.2 km || 
|-id=339 bgcolor=#E9E9E9
| 369339 ||  || — || July 30, 2009 || Catalina || CSS || — || align=right | 2.0 km || 
|-id=340 bgcolor=#E9E9E9
| 369340 ||  || — || September 22, 2009 || Mount Lemmon || Mount Lemmon Survey || — || align=right | 1.4 km || 
|-id=341 bgcolor=#E9E9E9
| 369341 ||  || — || September 27, 2009 || Mount Lemmon || Mount Lemmon Survey || — || align=right | 1.9 km || 
|-id=342 bgcolor=#E9E9E9
| 369342 ||  || — || September 20, 2009 || Catalina || CSS || — || align=right | 2.1 km || 
|-id=343 bgcolor=#E9E9E9
| 369343 ||  || — || September 21, 2009 || Catalina || CSS || — || align=right | 2.2 km || 
|-id=344 bgcolor=#E9E9E9
| 369344 ||  || — || September 16, 2009 || Catalina || CSS || JUN || align=right | 1.0 km || 
|-id=345 bgcolor=#E9E9E9
| 369345 ||  || — || September 25, 2009 || Catalina || CSS || — || align=right | 3.1 km || 
|-id=346 bgcolor=#E9E9E9
| 369346 ||  || — || September 28, 2009 || Catalina || CSS || INO || align=right | 1.1 km || 
|-id=347 bgcolor=#E9E9E9
| 369347 ||  || — || September 20, 2009 || Kitt Peak || Spacewatch || AST || align=right | 1.5 km || 
|-id=348 bgcolor=#E9E9E9
| 369348 ||  || — || September 20, 2009 || Kitt Peak || Spacewatch || RAF || align=right data-sort-value="0.81" | 810 m || 
|-id=349 bgcolor=#E9E9E9
| 369349 ||  || — || September 18, 2009 || Kitt Peak || Spacewatch || JUN || align=right data-sort-value="0.97" | 970 m || 
|-id=350 bgcolor=#E9E9E9
| 369350 ||  || — || September 23, 2009 || Kitt Peak || Spacewatch || — || align=right | 1.6 km || 
|-id=351 bgcolor=#E9E9E9
| 369351 ||  || — || September 16, 2009 || Mount Lemmon || Mount Lemmon Survey || AGN || align=right | 1.3 km || 
|-id=352 bgcolor=#d6d6d6
| 369352 ||  || — || September 16, 2009 || Kitt Peak || Spacewatch || — || align=right | 3.6 km || 
|-id=353 bgcolor=#E9E9E9
| 369353 ||  || — || October 11, 2009 || Dauban || F. Kugel || — || align=right data-sort-value="0.89" | 890 m || 
|-id=354 bgcolor=#E9E9E9
| 369354 ||  || — || October 14, 2009 || La Sagra || OAM Obs. || — || align=right | 1.1 km || 
|-id=355 bgcolor=#E9E9E9
| 369355 ||  || — || October 15, 2009 || La Sagra || OAM Obs. || — || align=right | 1.5 km || 
|-id=356 bgcolor=#E9E9E9
| 369356 ||  || — || October 15, 2009 || Mount Lemmon || Mount Lemmon Survey || DOR || align=right | 2.3 km || 
|-id=357 bgcolor=#E9E9E9
| 369357 ||  || — || October 14, 2009 || La Sagra || OAM Obs. || — || align=right | 1.3 km || 
|-id=358 bgcolor=#E9E9E9
| 369358 ||  || — || October 13, 2009 || La Sagra || OAM Obs. || — || align=right | 2.1 km || 
|-id=359 bgcolor=#E9E9E9
| 369359 ||  || — || October 16, 2009 || Mount Lemmon || Mount Lemmon Survey || — || align=right | 1.4 km || 
|-id=360 bgcolor=#E9E9E9
| 369360 ||  || — || October 16, 2009 || Mount Lemmon || Mount Lemmon Survey || — || align=right | 2.4 km || 
|-id=361 bgcolor=#E9E9E9
| 369361 ||  || — || October 16, 2009 || Mount Lemmon || Mount Lemmon Survey || — || align=right | 1.1 km || 
|-id=362 bgcolor=#E9E9E9
| 369362 ||  || — || October 22, 2009 || Bisei SG Center || BATTeRS || — || align=right | 1.3 km || 
|-id=363 bgcolor=#E9E9E9
| 369363 ||  || — || September 22, 2009 || Mount Lemmon || Mount Lemmon Survey || GEF || align=right | 2.7 km || 
|-id=364 bgcolor=#E9E9E9
| 369364 ||  || — || October 18, 2009 || Mount Lemmon || Mount Lemmon Survey || — || align=right | 1.7 km || 
|-id=365 bgcolor=#E9E9E9
| 369365 ||  || — || October 18, 2009 || Mount Lemmon || Mount Lemmon Survey || — || align=right | 2.3 km || 
|-id=366 bgcolor=#d6d6d6
| 369366 ||  || — || September 19, 2009 || Mount Lemmon || Mount Lemmon Survey || EOS || align=right | 1.8 km || 
|-id=367 bgcolor=#E9E9E9
| 369367 ||  || — || October 22, 2009 || Catalina || CSS || — || align=right | 2.0 km || 
|-id=368 bgcolor=#E9E9E9
| 369368 ||  || — || October 23, 2009 || Mount Lemmon || Mount Lemmon Survey || critical || align=right data-sort-value="0.96" | 960 m || 
|-id=369 bgcolor=#E9E9E9
| 369369 ||  || — || October 14, 2009 || Catalina || CSS || — || align=right | 2.8 km || 
|-id=370 bgcolor=#E9E9E9
| 369370 ||  || — || October 21, 2009 || Catalina || CSS || WIT || align=right data-sort-value="0.95" | 950 m || 
|-id=371 bgcolor=#E9E9E9
| 369371 ||  || — || October 23, 2009 || Kitt Peak || Spacewatch || — || align=right | 1.5 km || 
|-id=372 bgcolor=#E9E9E9
| 369372 ||  || — || October 23, 2009 || Kitt Peak || Spacewatch || — || align=right | 2.3 km || 
|-id=373 bgcolor=#E9E9E9
| 369373 ||  || — || September 10, 2004 || Socorro || LINEAR || — || align=right | 2.1 km || 
|-id=374 bgcolor=#E9E9E9
| 369374 ||  || — || September 17, 2009 || Mount Lemmon || Mount Lemmon Survey || — || align=right | 2.3 km || 
|-id=375 bgcolor=#E9E9E9
| 369375 ||  || — || October 16, 2009 || Catalina || CSS || ADE || align=right | 3.1 km || 
|-id=376 bgcolor=#E9E9E9
| 369376 ||  || — || October 27, 2009 || La Sagra || OAM Obs. || JUN || align=right | 1.1 km || 
|-id=377 bgcolor=#E9E9E9
| 369377 ||  || — || October 27, 2009 || Mount Lemmon || Mount Lemmon Survey || DOR || align=right | 2.9 km || 
|-id=378 bgcolor=#d6d6d6
| 369378 ||  || — || October 23, 2009 || Mount Lemmon || Mount Lemmon Survey || — || align=right | 3.2 km || 
|-id=379 bgcolor=#E9E9E9
| 369379 ||  || — || October 18, 2009 || Mount Lemmon || Mount Lemmon Survey || AST || align=right | 1.6 km || 
|-id=380 bgcolor=#E9E9E9
| 369380 ||  || — || October 28, 2009 || La Sagra || OAM Obs. || — || align=right | 1.5 km || 
|-id=381 bgcolor=#d6d6d6
| 369381 ||  || — || October 26, 2009 || Mount Lemmon || Mount Lemmon Survey || TIR || align=right | 3.8 km || 
|-id=382 bgcolor=#E9E9E9
| 369382 ||  || — || October 18, 2009 || Socorro || LINEAR || ADE || align=right | 2.4 km || 
|-id=383 bgcolor=#E9E9E9
| 369383 ||  || — || October 17, 2009 || Catalina || CSS || — || align=right | 2.5 km || 
|-id=384 bgcolor=#E9E9E9
| 369384 ||  || — || October 26, 2009 || Kitt Peak || Spacewatch || — || align=right | 2.2 km || 
|-id=385 bgcolor=#E9E9E9
| 369385 ||  || — || October 23, 2009 || Mount Lemmon || Mount Lemmon Survey || MRX || align=right data-sort-value="0.83" | 830 m || 
|-id=386 bgcolor=#d6d6d6
| 369386 ||  || — || November 8, 2009 || Mount Lemmon || Mount Lemmon Survey || — || align=right | 2.0 km || 
|-id=387 bgcolor=#d6d6d6
| 369387 ||  || — || November 8, 2009 || Mount Lemmon || Mount Lemmon Survey || — || align=right | 3.6 km || 
|-id=388 bgcolor=#d6d6d6
| 369388 ||  || — || November 10, 2009 || Catalina || CSS || — || align=right | 2.9 km || 
|-id=389 bgcolor=#E9E9E9
| 369389 ||  || — || November 10, 2009 || Catalina || CSS || GEF || align=right | 1.3 km || 
|-id=390 bgcolor=#E9E9E9
| 369390 ||  || — || November 8, 2009 || Kitt Peak || Spacewatch || AGN || align=right | 1.2 km || 
|-id=391 bgcolor=#E9E9E9
| 369391 ||  || — || November 8, 2009 || Kitt Peak || Spacewatch || — || align=right | 1.5 km || 
|-id=392 bgcolor=#E9E9E9
| 369392 ||  || — || November 15, 2009 || Catalina || CSS || — || align=right | 2.4 km || 
|-id=393 bgcolor=#E9E9E9
| 369393 ||  || — || November 10, 2009 || Catalina || CSS || RAF || align=right | 1.2 km || 
|-id=394 bgcolor=#d6d6d6
| 369394 ||  || — || November 8, 2009 || Kitt Peak || Spacewatch || EOS || align=right | 3.8 km || 
|-id=395 bgcolor=#E9E9E9
| 369395 ||  || — || November 9, 2009 || Kitt Peak || Spacewatch || — || align=right | 2.7 km || 
|-id=396 bgcolor=#E9E9E9
| 369396 ||  || — || November 10, 2009 || Kitt Peak || Spacewatch || AEO || align=right | 1.2 km || 
|-id=397 bgcolor=#E9E9E9
| 369397 ||  || — || November 12, 2009 || La Sagra || OAM Obs. || AEO || align=right | 1.9 km || 
|-id=398 bgcolor=#E9E9E9
| 369398 ||  || — || November 15, 2009 || Siding Spring || SSS || — || align=right | 1.8 km || 
|-id=399 bgcolor=#E9E9E9
| 369399 ||  || — || November 15, 2009 || Socorro || LINEAR || MAR || align=right | 1.2 km || 
|-id=400 bgcolor=#E9E9E9
| 369400 ||  || — || November 18, 2009 || Tzec Maun || D. Chestnov, A. Novichonok || AEO || align=right | 1.3 km || 
|}

369401–369500 

|-bgcolor=#E9E9E9
| 369401 ||  || — || November 18, 2009 || Socorro || LINEAR || — || align=right | 1.4 km || 
|-id=402 bgcolor=#d6d6d6
| 369402 ||  || — || October 22, 2009 || Mount Lemmon || Mount Lemmon Survey || KOR || align=right | 1.5 km || 
|-id=403 bgcolor=#d6d6d6
| 369403 ||  || — || November 18, 2009 || Kitt Peak || Spacewatch || EOS || align=right | 4.0 km || 
|-id=404 bgcolor=#E9E9E9
| 369404 ||  || — || November 20, 2009 || Westfield || ARO || — || align=right | 1.5 km || 
|-id=405 bgcolor=#d6d6d6
| 369405 ||  || — || November 22, 2009 || Mount Lemmon || Mount Lemmon Survey || EUP || align=right | 5.9 km || 
|-id=406 bgcolor=#FA8072
| 369406 ||  || — || November 22, 2009 || Catalina || CSS || — || align=right | 1.9 km || 
|-id=407 bgcolor=#d6d6d6
| 369407 ||  || — || November 17, 2009 || Kitt Peak || Spacewatch || KOR || align=right | 1.9 km || 
|-id=408 bgcolor=#d6d6d6
| 369408 ||  || — || November 18, 2009 || Kitt Peak || Spacewatch || — || align=right | 3.2 km || 
|-id=409 bgcolor=#d6d6d6
| 369409 ||  || — || November 10, 2009 || Kitt Peak || Spacewatch || — || align=right | 3.0 km || 
|-id=410 bgcolor=#d6d6d6
| 369410 ||  || — || November 17, 2009 || Mount Lemmon || Mount Lemmon Survey || — || align=right | 2.2 km || 
|-id=411 bgcolor=#d6d6d6
| 369411 ||  || — || November 18, 2009 || Kitt Peak || Spacewatch || EMA || align=right | 5.0 km || 
|-id=412 bgcolor=#d6d6d6
| 369412 ||  || — || November 19, 2009 || Kitt Peak || Spacewatch || — || align=right | 3.0 km || 
|-id=413 bgcolor=#E9E9E9
| 369413 ||  || — || November 19, 2009 || Mount Lemmon || Mount Lemmon Survey || — || align=right | 2.8 km || 
|-id=414 bgcolor=#E9E9E9
| 369414 ||  || — || November 21, 2009 || Kitt Peak || Spacewatch || — || align=right | 2.5 km || 
|-id=415 bgcolor=#d6d6d6
| 369415 ||  || — || November 14, 2009 || La Sagra || OAM Obs. || — || align=right | 4.7 km || 
|-id=416 bgcolor=#d6d6d6
| 369416 ||  || — || November 22, 2009 || Catalina || CSS || — || align=right | 2.5 km || 
|-id=417 bgcolor=#E9E9E9
| 369417 ||  || — || March 12, 2007 || Mount Lemmon || Mount Lemmon Survey || AGN || align=right | 1.2 km || 
|-id=418 bgcolor=#d6d6d6
| 369418 ||  || — || February 25, 2006 || Mount Lemmon || Mount Lemmon Survey || KOR || align=right | 1.5 km || 
|-id=419 bgcolor=#d6d6d6
| 369419 ||  || — || November 21, 2009 || Kitt Peak || Spacewatch || — || align=right | 2.6 km || 
|-id=420 bgcolor=#E9E9E9
| 369420 ||  || — || November 22, 2009 || Kitt Peak || Spacewatch || — || align=right | 2.1 km || 
|-id=421 bgcolor=#d6d6d6
| 369421 ||  || — || November 23, 2009 || Kitt Peak || Spacewatch || CHA || align=right | 2.3 km || 
|-id=422 bgcolor=#d6d6d6
| 369422 ||  || — || November 24, 2009 || Purple Mountain || PMO NEO || EOS || align=right | 2.5 km || 
|-id=423 bgcolor=#d6d6d6
| 369423 Quintegr'al ||  ||  || January 28, 2006 || Nogales || J.-C. Merlin || — || align=right | 2.2 km || 
|-id=424 bgcolor=#E9E9E9
| 369424 ||  || — || January 21, 2006 || Mount Lemmon || Mount Lemmon Survey || AGN || align=right | 1.3 km || 
|-id=425 bgcolor=#d6d6d6
| 369425 ||  || — || November 17, 2009 || Kitt Peak || Spacewatch || — || align=right | 2.4 km || 
|-id=426 bgcolor=#d6d6d6
| 369426 ||  || — || November 18, 2009 || Kitt Peak || Spacewatch || — || align=right | 2.7 km || 
|-id=427 bgcolor=#E9E9E9
| 369427 ||  || — || September 21, 2009 || Mount Lemmon || Mount Lemmon Survey || — || align=right | 2.6 km || 
|-id=428 bgcolor=#d6d6d6
| 369428 ||  || — || September 24, 2008 || Kitt Peak || Spacewatch || HYG || align=right | 3.6 km || 
|-id=429 bgcolor=#d6d6d6
| 369429 ||  || — || November 16, 2009 || Mount Lemmon || Mount Lemmon Survey || EMA || align=right | 4.6 km || 
|-id=430 bgcolor=#d6d6d6
| 369430 ||  || — || November 24, 2009 || Kitt Peak || Spacewatch || — || align=right | 4.9 km || 
|-id=431 bgcolor=#d6d6d6
| 369431 ||  || — || November 21, 2009 || Mount Lemmon || Mount Lemmon Survey || — || align=right | 3.2 km || 
|-id=432 bgcolor=#d6d6d6
| 369432 ||  || — || December 10, 2009 || Mayhill || A. Lowe || — || align=right | 5.4 km || 
|-id=433 bgcolor=#d6d6d6
| 369433 ||  || — || January 25, 2006 || Kitt Peak || Spacewatch || THM || align=right | 2.9 km || 
|-id=434 bgcolor=#d6d6d6
| 369434 ||  || — || December 15, 2009 || Mount Lemmon || Mount Lemmon Survey || — || align=right | 2.6 km || 
|-id=435 bgcolor=#d6d6d6
| 369435 ||  || — || February 9, 2005 || Anderson Mesa || LONEOS || — || align=right | 3.6 km || 
|-id=436 bgcolor=#E9E9E9
| 369436 ||  || — || November 23, 2009 || Mount Lemmon || Mount Lemmon Survey || — || align=right | 2.9 km || 
|-id=437 bgcolor=#d6d6d6
| 369437 ||  || — || December 25, 2009 || Kitt Peak || Spacewatch || — || align=right | 3.7 km || 
|-id=438 bgcolor=#d6d6d6
| 369438 ||  || — || January 5, 2010 || Kitt Peak || Spacewatch || — || align=right | 4.6 km || 
|-id=439 bgcolor=#d6d6d6
| 369439 ||  || — || January 7, 2010 || Kitt Peak || Spacewatch || 7:4 || align=right | 5.9 km || 
|-id=440 bgcolor=#d6d6d6
| 369440 ||  || — || January 10, 2010 || Kitt Peak || Spacewatch || — || align=right | 3.4 km || 
|-id=441 bgcolor=#d6d6d6
| 369441 ||  || — || January 12, 2010 || Catalina || CSS || — || align=right | 5.6 km || 
|-id=442 bgcolor=#d6d6d6
| 369442 ||  || — || January 12, 2010 || Mount Lemmon || Mount Lemmon Survey || — || align=right | 5.3 km || 
|-id=443 bgcolor=#d6d6d6
| 369443 ||  || — || January 16, 2010 || Kitt Peak || Spacewatch || — || align=right | 4.8 km || 
|-id=444 bgcolor=#d6d6d6
| 369444 ||  || — || January 18, 2010 || Dauban || F. Kugel || — || align=right | 4.1 km || 
|-id=445 bgcolor=#E9E9E9
| 369445 ||  || — || January 19, 2010 || WISE || WISE || — || align=right | 2.3 km || 
|-id=446 bgcolor=#E9E9E9
| 369446 ||  || — || January 21, 2010 || WISE || WISE || — || align=right | 2.6 km || 
|-id=447 bgcolor=#d6d6d6
| 369447 ||  || — || February 13, 2010 || Mount Lemmon || Mount Lemmon Survey || — || align=right | 2.9 km || 
|-id=448 bgcolor=#d6d6d6
| 369448 ||  || — || September 28, 2008 || Mount Lemmon || Mount Lemmon Survey || VER || align=right | 4.2 km || 
|-id=449 bgcolor=#d6d6d6
| 369449 ||  || — || December 11, 2009 || Mount Lemmon || Mount Lemmon Survey || — || align=right | 4.4 km || 
|-id=450 bgcolor=#d6d6d6
| 369450 ||  || — || February 14, 2010 || Mount Lemmon || Mount Lemmon Survey || — || align=right | 4.6 km || 
|-id=451 bgcolor=#d6d6d6
| 369451 ||  || — || October 30, 2008 || Catalina || CSS || — || align=right | 4.0 km || 
|-id=452 bgcolor=#FFC2E0
| 369452 ||  || — || June 4, 2010 || Kitt Peak || Spacewatch || APO +1km || align=right data-sort-value="0.93" | 930 m || 
|-id=453 bgcolor=#fefefe
| 369453 ||  || — || June 10, 2010 || WISE || WISE || — || align=right | 1.5 km || 
|-id=454 bgcolor=#FFC2E0
| 369454 ||  || — || July 9, 2010 || WISE || WISE || APO || align=right data-sort-value="0.85" | 850 m || 
|-id=455 bgcolor=#fefefe
| 369455 ||  || — || February 9, 2005 || Anderson Mesa || LONEOS || — || align=right | 1.5 km || 
|-id=456 bgcolor=#fefefe
| 369456 ||  || — || September 28, 2000 || Kitt Peak || Spacewatch || — || align=right | 1.2 km || 
|-id=457 bgcolor=#fefefe
| 369457 ||  || — || February 2, 2005 || Kitt Peak || Spacewatch || V || align=right data-sort-value="0.83" | 830 m || 
|-id=458 bgcolor=#fefefe
| 369458 ||  || — || January 30, 2009 || Mount Lemmon || Mount Lemmon Survey || — || align=right data-sort-value="0.76" | 760 m || 
|-id=459 bgcolor=#fefefe
| 369459 ||  || — || March 20, 1999 || Apache Point || SDSS || — || align=right data-sort-value="0.73" | 730 m || 
|-id=460 bgcolor=#d6d6d6
| 369460 ||  || — || September 6, 2010 || Kitt Peak || Spacewatch || — || align=right | 2.4 km || 
|-id=461 bgcolor=#FA8072
| 369461 ||  || — || September 5, 2010 || La Sagra || OAM Obs. || — || align=right data-sort-value="0.64" | 640 m || 
|-id=462 bgcolor=#fefefe
| 369462 ||  || — || September 22, 2003 || Kitt Peak || Spacewatch || — || align=right data-sort-value="0.72" | 720 m || 
|-id=463 bgcolor=#FA8072
| 369463 ||  || — || September 11, 2010 || Kitt Peak || Spacewatch || — || align=right data-sort-value="0.71" | 710 m || 
|-id=464 bgcolor=#fefefe
| 369464 ||  || — || December 16, 2007 || Mount Lemmon || Mount Lemmon Survey || FLO || align=right data-sort-value="0.55" | 550 m || 
|-id=465 bgcolor=#fefefe
| 369465 ||  || — || November 13, 2007 || Mount Lemmon || Mount Lemmon Survey || FLO || align=right data-sort-value="0.43" | 430 m || 
|-id=466 bgcolor=#fefefe
| 369466 ||  || — || October 9, 2007 || Mount Lemmon || Mount Lemmon Survey || — || align=right data-sort-value="0.70" | 700 m || 
|-id=467 bgcolor=#fefefe
| 369467 ||  || — || December 20, 2004 || Mount Lemmon || Mount Lemmon Survey || — || align=right data-sort-value="0.88" | 880 m || 
|-id=468 bgcolor=#fefefe
| 369468 ||  || — || November 5, 2007 || Kitt Peak || Spacewatch || — || align=right data-sort-value="0.48" | 480 m || 
|-id=469 bgcolor=#fefefe
| 369469 ||  || — || May 1, 2009 || Kitt Peak || Spacewatch || — || align=right data-sort-value="0.65" | 650 m || 
|-id=470 bgcolor=#fefefe
| 369470 ||  || — || May 4, 2006 || Mount Lemmon || Mount Lemmon Survey || — || align=right data-sort-value="0.68" | 680 m || 
|-id=471 bgcolor=#fefefe
| 369471 ||  || — || December 31, 2007 || Kitt Peak || Spacewatch || — || align=right data-sort-value="0.55" | 550 m || 
|-id=472 bgcolor=#fefefe
| 369472 ||  || — || February 9, 2005 || Mount Lemmon || Mount Lemmon Survey || — || align=right data-sort-value="0.62" | 620 m || 
|-id=473 bgcolor=#fefefe
| 369473 ||  || — || September 21, 2003 || Kitt Peak || Spacewatch || V || align=right data-sort-value="0.68" | 680 m || 
|-id=474 bgcolor=#fefefe
| 369474 ||  || — || March 9, 2005 || Mount Lemmon || Mount Lemmon Survey || V || align=right data-sort-value="0.55" | 550 m || 
|-id=475 bgcolor=#fefefe
| 369475 ||  || — || September 30, 2010 || Jarnac || T. Glinos || — || align=right | 1.1 km || 
|-id=476 bgcolor=#d6d6d6
| 369476 ||  || — || November 3, 1999 || Kitt Peak || Spacewatch || — || align=right | 2.9 km || 
|-id=477 bgcolor=#d6d6d6
| 369477 ||  || — || December 7, 2005 || Kitt Peak || Spacewatch || — || align=right | 3.0 km || 
|-id=478 bgcolor=#fefefe
| 369478 ||  || — || October 2, 1997 || Kitt Peak || Spacewatch || — || align=right data-sort-value="0.61" | 610 m || 
|-id=479 bgcolor=#fefefe
| 369479 ||  || — || June 1, 2009 || Mount Lemmon || Mount Lemmon Survey || — || align=right | 1.0 km || 
|-id=480 bgcolor=#fefefe
| 369480 ||  || — || April 21, 2006 || Kitt Peak || Spacewatch || — || align=right | 1.0 km || 
|-id=481 bgcolor=#fefefe
| 369481 ||  || — || March 2, 2009 || Kitt Peak || Spacewatch || — || align=right data-sort-value="0.78" | 780 m || 
|-id=482 bgcolor=#fefefe
| 369482 ||  || — || October 5, 2010 || La Sagra || OAM Obs. || — || align=right data-sort-value="0.89" | 890 m || 
|-id=483 bgcolor=#fefefe
| 369483 ||  || — || September 9, 2010 || Les Engarouines || L. Bernasconi || — || align=right data-sort-value="0.86" | 860 m || 
|-id=484 bgcolor=#fefefe
| 369484 ||  || — || October 2, 2010 || La Sagra || OAM Obs. || FLO || align=right data-sort-value="0.64" | 640 m || 
|-id=485 bgcolor=#fefefe
| 369485 ||  || — || October 16, 2010 || Mayhill-ISON || L. Elenin, A. Novichonok || — || align=right | 1.1 km || 
|-id=486 bgcolor=#FA8072
| 369486 ||  || — || May 7, 2000 || Kitt Peak || Spacewatch || — || align=right data-sort-value="0.68" | 680 m || 
|-id=487 bgcolor=#fefefe
| 369487 ||  || — || September 16, 2010 || Mount Lemmon || Mount Lemmon Survey || — || align=right data-sort-value="0.74" | 740 m || 
|-id=488 bgcolor=#fefefe
| 369488 ||  || — || September 11, 2010 || Mount Lemmon || Mount Lemmon Survey || — || align=right data-sort-value="0.94" | 940 m || 
|-id=489 bgcolor=#fefefe
| 369489 ||  || — || January 13, 2008 || Mount Lemmon || Mount Lemmon Survey || — || align=right data-sort-value="0.79" | 790 m || 
|-id=490 bgcolor=#fefefe
| 369490 ||  || — || March 20, 1999 || Apache Point || SDSS || — || align=right data-sort-value="0.78" | 780 m || 
|-id=491 bgcolor=#fefefe
| 369491 ||  || — || October 21, 1997 || Kitt Peak || Spacewatch || — || align=right data-sort-value="0.83" | 830 m || 
|-id=492 bgcolor=#fefefe
| 369492 ||  || — || December 27, 2003 || Socorro || LINEAR || — || align=right data-sort-value="0.90" | 900 m || 
|-id=493 bgcolor=#fefefe
| 369493 ||  || — || September 24, 2000 || Socorro || LINEAR || — || align=right data-sort-value="0.79" | 790 m || 
|-id=494 bgcolor=#fefefe
| 369494 ||  || — || April 29, 2006 || Siding Spring || SSS || — || align=right data-sort-value="0.99" | 990 m || 
|-id=495 bgcolor=#fefefe
| 369495 ||  || — || October 15, 2007 || Mount Lemmon || Mount Lemmon Survey || — || align=right data-sort-value="0.66" | 660 m || 
|-id=496 bgcolor=#fefefe
| 369496 ||  || — || September 17, 1995 || Kitt Peak || Spacewatch || MAS || align=right data-sort-value="0.66" | 660 m || 
|-id=497 bgcolor=#fefefe
| 369497 ||  || — || September 30, 2003 || Kitt Peak || Spacewatch || — || align=right data-sort-value="0.78" | 780 m || 
|-id=498 bgcolor=#fefefe
| 369498 ||  || — || September 16, 2003 || Socorro || LINEAR || FLO || align=right data-sort-value="0.79" | 790 m || 
|-id=499 bgcolor=#FA8072
| 369499 ||  || — || November 3, 2007 || Kitt Peak || Spacewatch || — || align=right data-sort-value="0.68" | 680 m || 
|-id=500 bgcolor=#fefefe
| 369500 ||  || — || September 20, 2003 || Kitt Peak || Spacewatch || V || align=right data-sort-value="0.55" | 550 m || 
|}

369501–369600 

|-bgcolor=#fefefe
| 369501 ||  || — || November 21, 2003 || Socorro || LINEAR || NYS || align=right data-sort-value="0.70" | 700 m || 
|-id=502 bgcolor=#fefefe
| 369502 ||  || — || December 18, 2007 || Mount Lemmon || Mount Lemmon Survey || — || align=right data-sort-value="0.85" | 850 m || 
|-id=503 bgcolor=#fefefe
| 369503 ||  || — || November 20, 2003 || Socorro || LINEAR || — || align=right data-sort-value="0.79" | 790 m || 
|-id=504 bgcolor=#fefefe
| 369504 ||  || — || October 1, 2000 || Socorro || LINEAR || FLO || align=right data-sort-value="0.55" | 550 m || 
|-id=505 bgcolor=#fefefe
| 369505 ||  || — || October 17, 2006 || Catalina || CSS || — || align=right | 1.1 km || 
|-id=506 bgcolor=#E9E9E9
| 369506 ||  || — || December 13, 2006 || Mount Lemmon || Mount Lemmon Survey || RAF || align=right | 1.2 km || 
|-id=507 bgcolor=#d6d6d6
| 369507 ||  || — || November 25, 2005 || Mount Lemmon || Mount Lemmon Survey || — || align=right | 2.4 km || 
|-id=508 bgcolor=#fefefe
| 369508 ||  || — || February 8, 2008 || Kitt Peak || Spacewatch || — || align=right data-sort-value="0.66" | 660 m || 
|-id=509 bgcolor=#fefefe
| 369509 ||  || — || September 30, 2006 || Catalina || CSS || V || align=right data-sort-value="0.94" | 940 m || 
|-id=510 bgcolor=#fefefe
| 369510 ||  || — || September 15, 2006 || Kitt Peak || Spacewatch || ERI || align=right | 1.6 km || 
|-id=511 bgcolor=#fefefe
| 369511 ||  || — || January 16, 2004 || Kitt Peak || Spacewatch || — || align=right data-sort-value="0.61" | 610 m || 
|-id=512 bgcolor=#E9E9E9
| 369512 ||  || — || December 13, 2006 || Mount Lemmon || Mount Lemmon Survey || — || align=right | 1.8 km || 
|-id=513 bgcolor=#fefefe
| 369513 ||  || — || March 4, 2001 || Kitt Peak || Spacewatch || NYS || align=right data-sort-value="0.60" | 600 m || 
|-id=514 bgcolor=#fefefe
| 369514 ||  || — || February 26, 2008 || Mount Lemmon || Mount Lemmon Survey || — || align=right data-sort-value="0.70" | 700 m || 
|-id=515 bgcolor=#fefefe
| 369515 ||  || — || September 19, 2003 || Kitt Peak || Spacewatch || — || align=right data-sort-value="0.61" | 610 m || 
|-id=516 bgcolor=#fefefe
| 369516 ||  || — || October 4, 2003 || Kitt Peak || Spacewatch || — || align=right data-sort-value="0.98" | 980 m || 
|-id=517 bgcolor=#fefefe
| 369517 ||  || — || March 4, 2005 || Mount Lemmon || Mount Lemmon Survey || — || align=right data-sort-value="0.58" | 580 m || 
|-id=518 bgcolor=#fefefe
| 369518 ||  || — || November 19, 2003 || Kitt Peak || Spacewatch || V || align=right data-sort-value="0.83" | 830 m || 
|-id=519 bgcolor=#fefefe
| 369519 ||  || — || September 18, 2003 || Kitt Peak || Spacewatch || — || align=right data-sort-value="0.73" | 730 m || 
|-id=520 bgcolor=#fefefe
| 369520 ||  || — || August 23, 2003 || Palomar || NEAT || — || align=right data-sort-value="0.67" | 670 m || 
|-id=521 bgcolor=#fefefe
| 369521 ||  || — || October 17, 2003 || Kitt Peak || Spacewatch || — || align=right data-sort-value="0.92" | 920 m || 
|-id=522 bgcolor=#fefefe
| 369522 ||  || — || October 27, 2003 || Kitt Peak || Spacewatch || — || align=right | 1.3 km || 
|-id=523 bgcolor=#fefefe
| 369523 ||  || — || October 16, 2003 || Kitt Peak || Spacewatch || — || align=right data-sort-value="0.65" | 650 m || 
|-id=524 bgcolor=#E9E9E9
| 369524 ||  || — || November 19, 2006 || Kitt Peak || Spacewatch || — || align=right | 1.1 km || 
|-id=525 bgcolor=#fefefe
| 369525 ||  || — || August 15, 1993 || Kitt Peak || Spacewatch || FLO || align=right data-sort-value="0.60" | 600 m || 
|-id=526 bgcolor=#E9E9E9
| 369526 ||  || — || October 24, 2005 || Kitt Peak || Spacewatch || HNA || align=right | 2.1 km || 
|-id=527 bgcolor=#fefefe
| 369527 ||  || — || August 27, 2006 || Anderson Mesa || LONEOS || FLO || align=right data-sort-value="0.70" | 700 m || 
|-id=528 bgcolor=#fefefe
| 369528 ||  || — || November 30, 2010 || Mount Lemmon || Mount Lemmon Survey || V || align=right data-sort-value="0.75" | 750 m || 
|-id=529 bgcolor=#E9E9E9
| 369529 ||  || — || November 30, 2010 || Mount Lemmon || Mount Lemmon Survey || — || align=right | 3.1 km || 
|-id=530 bgcolor=#E9E9E9
| 369530 ||  || — || March 31, 2008 || Kitt Peak || Spacewatch || — || align=right data-sort-value="0.93" | 930 m || 
|-id=531 bgcolor=#fefefe
| 369531 ||  || — || January 19, 2005 || Kitt Peak || Spacewatch || FLO || align=right data-sort-value="0.69" | 690 m || 
|-id=532 bgcolor=#E9E9E9
| 369532 ||  || — || March 2, 1995 || Kitt Peak || Spacewatch || — || align=right | 1.6 km || 
|-id=533 bgcolor=#d6d6d6
| 369533 ||  || — || December 24, 2005 || Kitt Peak || Spacewatch || FIR || align=right | 3.9 km || 
|-id=534 bgcolor=#E9E9E9
| 369534 ||  || — || December 4, 2010 || Mount Lemmon || Mount Lemmon Survey || — || align=right | 1.5 km || 
|-id=535 bgcolor=#E9E9E9
| 369535 ||  || — || May 27, 2008 || Mount Lemmon || Mount Lemmon Survey || EUN || align=right | 1.6 km || 
|-id=536 bgcolor=#d6d6d6
| 369536 ||  || — || April 2, 2005 || Catalina || CSS || 3:2 || align=right | 7.8 km || 
|-id=537 bgcolor=#d6d6d6
| 369537 ||  || — || February 1, 2006 || Siding Spring || SSS || THB || align=right | 4.3 km || 
|-id=538 bgcolor=#d6d6d6
| 369538 ||  || — || September 20, 2009 || Mount Lemmon || Mount Lemmon Survey || — || align=right | 3.0 km || 
|-id=539 bgcolor=#FA8072
| 369539 ||  || — || January 30, 2001 || Haleakala || NEAT || PHO || align=right | 1.2 km || 
|-id=540 bgcolor=#E9E9E9
| 369540 ||  || — || November 4, 2005 || Mount Lemmon || Mount Lemmon Survey || — || align=right | 2.3 km || 
|-id=541 bgcolor=#E9E9E9
| 369541 ||  || — || August 11, 2004 || Socorro || LINEAR || — || align=right | 2.9 km || 
|-id=542 bgcolor=#E9E9E9
| 369542 ||  || — || November 5, 2010 || Mount Lemmon || Mount Lemmon Survey || — || align=right data-sort-value="0.87" | 870 m || 
|-id=543 bgcolor=#d6d6d6
| 369543 ||  || — || October 29, 2005 || Mount Lemmon || Mount Lemmon Survey || — || align=right | 2.4 km || 
|-id=544 bgcolor=#d6d6d6
| 369544 ||  || — || May 16, 2007 || Mount Lemmon || Mount Lemmon Survey || — || align=right | 3.3 km || 
|-id=545 bgcolor=#E9E9E9
| 369545 ||  || — || February 21, 2007 || Mount Lemmon || Mount Lemmon Survey || PAD || align=right | 1.6 km || 
|-id=546 bgcolor=#d6d6d6
| 369546 ||  || — || December 6, 2010 || Mount Lemmon || Mount Lemmon Survey || — || align=right | 3.1 km || 
|-id=547 bgcolor=#E9E9E9
| 369547 ||  || — || September 16, 2009 || Kitt Peak || Spacewatch || AGN || align=right | 1.3 km || 
|-id=548 bgcolor=#E9E9E9
| 369548 ||  || — || September 18, 2009 || Catalina || CSS || — || align=right | 3.1 km || 
|-id=549 bgcolor=#E9E9E9
| 369549 ||  || — || February 26, 2007 || Mount Lemmon || Mount Lemmon Survey || — || align=right | 1.8 km || 
|-id=550 bgcolor=#FA8072
| 369550 ||  || — || August 16, 2006 || Siding Spring || SSS || PHO || align=right | 1.0 km || 
|-id=551 bgcolor=#fefefe
| 369551 ||  || — || November 16, 2006 || Kitt Peak || Spacewatch || — || align=right data-sort-value="0.71" | 710 m || 
|-id=552 bgcolor=#E9E9E9
| 369552 ||  || — || September 7, 2004 || Kitt Peak || Spacewatch || WIT || align=right data-sort-value="0.94" | 940 m || 
|-id=553 bgcolor=#fefefe
| 369553 ||  || — || November 13, 2002 || Needville || J. Dellinger || MAS || align=right data-sort-value="0.87" | 870 m || 
|-id=554 bgcolor=#E9E9E9
| 369554 ||  || — || November 27, 2006 || Mount Lemmon || Mount Lemmon Survey || — || align=right | 1.4 km || 
|-id=555 bgcolor=#fefefe
| 369555 ||  || — || September 30, 2006 || Mount Lemmon || Mount Lemmon Survey || NYS || align=right data-sort-value="0.56" | 560 m || 
|-id=556 bgcolor=#d6d6d6
| 369556 ||  || — || December 25, 2005 || Kitt Peak || Spacewatch || KOR || align=right | 1.2 km || 
|-id=557 bgcolor=#fefefe
| 369557 ||  || — || August 6, 2002 || Palomar || NEAT || — || align=right data-sort-value="0.97" | 970 m || 
|-id=558 bgcolor=#fefefe
| 369558 ||  || — || February 4, 2000 || Kitt Peak || Spacewatch || — || align=right | 1.1 km || 
|-id=559 bgcolor=#d6d6d6
| 369559 ||  || — || September 6, 2008 || Mount Lemmon || Mount Lemmon Survey || — || align=right | 3.4 km || 
|-id=560 bgcolor=#d6d6d6
| 369560 ||  || — || January 27, 2010 || WISE || WISE || EUP || align=right | 3.8 km || 
|-id=561 bgcolor=#E9E9E9
| 369561 ||  || — || November 10, 2010 || Mount Lemmon || Mount Lemmon Survey || — || align=right | 1.3 km || 
|-id=562 bgcolor=#d6d6d6
| 369562 ||  || — || January 25, 2006 || Kitt Peak || Spacewatch || — || align=right | 2.3 km || 
|-id=563 bgcolor=#d6d6d6
| 369563 ||  || — || January 8, 2011 || Mount Lemmon || Mount Lemmon Survey || — || align=right | 3.2 km || 
|-id=564 bgcolor=#d6d6d6
| 369564 ||  || — || April 7, 2006 || Siding Spring || SSS || — || align=right | 4.2 km || 
|-id=565 bgcolor=#E9E9E9
| 369565 ||  || — || August 16, 2001 || Palomar || NEAT || — || align=right | 1.3 km || 
|-id=566 bgcolor=#FA8072
| 369566 ||  || — || August 13, 2006 || Siding Spring || SSS || PHO || align=right | 1.2 km || 
|-id=567 bgcolor=#E9E9E9
| 369567 ||  || — || December 29, 2005 || Mount Lemmon || Mount Lemmon Survey || — || align=right | 2.6 km || 
|-id=568 bgcolor=#E9E9E9
| 369568 ||  || — || December 8, 2010 || Mount Lemmon || Mount Lemmon Survey || AER || align=right | 1.7 km || 
|-id=569 bgcolor=#d6d6d6
| 369569 ||  || — || March 13, 2007 || Mount Lemmon || Mount Lemmon Survey || — || align=right | 2.8 km || 
|-id=570 bgcolor=#E9E9E9
| 369570 ||  || — || January 10, 2007 || Mount Lemmon || Mount Lemmon Survey || KAZ || align=right | 1.0 km || 
|-id=571 bgcolor=#E9E9E9
| 369571 ||  || — || December 6, 2005 || Kitt Peak || Spacewatch || — || align=right | 1.8 km || 
|-id=572 bgcolor=#E9E9E9
| 369572 ||  || — || February 21, 2007 || Mount Lemmon || Mount Lemmon Survey || — || align=right data-sort-value="0.82" | 820 m || 
|-id=573 bgcolor=#E9E9E9
| 369573 ||  || — || April 23, 2007 || Mount Graham || D. E. Trilling || — || align=right | 1.3 km || 
|-id=574 bgcolor=#E9E9E9
| 369574 ||  || — || November 11, 2005 || Kitt Peak || Spacewatch || — || align=right | 1.8 km || 
|-id=575 bgcolor=#E9E9E9
| 369575 ||  || — || October 25, 2005 || Kitt Peak || Spacewatch || — || align=right | 1.7 km || 
|-id=576 bgcolor=#d6d6d6
| 369576 ||  || — || October 3, 1999 || Kitt Peak || Spacewatch || — || align=right | 2.7 km || 
|-id=577 bgcolor=#E9E9E9
| 369577 ||  || — || September 28, 2009 || Mount Lemmon || Mount Lemmon Survey || PAD || align=right | 1.7 km || 
|-id=578 bgcolor=#E9E9E9
| 369578 ||  || — || August 3, 2004 || Siding Spring || SSS || — || align=right | 2.1 km || 
|-id=579 bgcolor=#d6d6d6
| 369579 ||  || — || January 29, 2011 || Kitt Peak || Spacewatch || VER || align=right | 2.7 km || 
|-id=580 bgcolor=#E9E9E9
| 369580 ||  || — || October 17, 2001 || Socorro || LINEAR || — || align=right | 1.0 km || 
|-id=581 bgcolor=#E9E9E9
| 369581 ||  || — || October 14, 2009 || Mount Lemmon || Mount Lemmon Survey || — || align=right | 2.1 km || 
|-id=582 bgcolor=#d6d6d6
| 369582 ||  || — || February 19, 2001 || Kitt Peak || Spacewatch || — || align=right | 3.2 km || 
|-id=583 bgcolor=#E9E9E9
| 369583 ||  || — || March 5, 2002 || Kitt Peak || Spacewatch || PAD || align=right | 1.7 km || 
|-id=584 bgcolor=#d6d6d6
| 369584 ||  || — || September 30, 2003 || Kitt Peak || Spacewatch || — || align=right | 2.2 km || 
|-id=585 bgcolor=#E9E9E9
| 369585 ||  || — || September 17, 2009 || Kitt Peak || Spacewatch || — || align=right | 1.6 km || 
|-id=586 bgcolor=#E9E9E9
| 369586 ||  || — || April 13, 2008 || Mount Lemmon || Mount Lemmon Survey || — || align=right | 1.2 km || 
|-id=587 bgcolor=#E9E9E9
| 369587 ||  || — || February 26, 2007 || Mount Lemmon || Mount Lemmon Survey || — || align=right | 2.6 km || 
|-id=588 bgcolor=#E9E9E9
| 369588 ||  || — || August 23, 2004 || Kitt Peak || Spacewatch || HOF || align=right | 2.0 km || 
|-id=589 bgcolor=#E9E9E9
| 369589 ||  || — || August 21, 2004 || Siding Spring || SSS || — || align=right | 2.3 km || 
|-id=590 bgcolor=#E9E9E9
| 369590 ||  || — || November 1, 2005 || Kitt Peak || Spacewatch || — || align=right | 1.3 km || 
|-id=591 bgcolor=#E9E9E9
| 369591 ||  || — || February 7, 2002 || Kitt Peak || Spacewatch || — || align=right | 2.1 km || 
|-id=592 bgcolor=#d6d6d6
| 369592 ||  || — || September 2, 2008 || Kitt Peak || Spacewatch || — || align=right | 4.3 km || 
|-id=593 bgcolor=#fefefe
| 369593 ||  || — || November 24, 2002 || Palomar || NEAT || NYS || align=right data-sort-value="0.71" | 710 m || 
|-id=594 bgcolor=#d6d6d6
| 369594 ||  || — || September 9, 2008 || Mount Lemmon || Mount Lemmon Survey || — || align=right | 3.2 km || 
|-id=595 bgcolor=#d6d6d6
| 369595 ||  || — || September 18, 2003 || Kitt Peak || Spacewatch || — || align=right | 2.7 km || 
|-id=596 bgcolor=#d6d6d6
| 369596 ||  || — || December 10, 2010 || Mount Lemmon || Mount Lemmon Survey || KOR || align=right | 1.5 km || 
|-id=597 bgcolor=#E9E9E9
| 369597 ||  || — || February 25, 2007 || Mount Lemmon || Mount Lemmon Survey || NEM || align=right | 2.5 km || 
|-id=598 bgcolor=#E9E9E9
| 369598 ||  || — || January 30, 2003 || Kitt Peak || Spacewatch || — || align=right data-sort-value="0.89" | 890 m || 
|-id=599 bgcolor=#E9E9E9
| 369599 ||  || — || August 8, 2004 || Socorro || LINEAR || HNS || align=right | 1.6 km || 
|-id=600 bgcolor=#E9E9E9
| 369600 ||  || — || February 6, 2002 || Socorro || LINEAR || — || align=right | 2.6 km || 
|}

369601–369700 

|-bgcolor=#E9E9E9
| 369601 ||  || — || January 14, 2011 || Kitt Peak || Spacewatch || AGN || align=right | 1.1 km || 
|-id=602 bgcolor=#d6d6d6
| 369602 ||  || — || September 6, 2008 || Kitt Peak || Spacewatch || — || align=right | 2.7 km || 
|-id=603 bgcolor=#d6d6d6
| 369603 ||  || — || January 18, 2006 || Catalina || CSS || — || align=right | 3.1 km || 
|-id=604 bgcolor=#d6d6d6
| 369604 ||  || — || December 11, 2004 || Kitt Peak || Spacewatch || — || align=right | 3.6 km || 
|-id=605 bgcolor=#d6d6d6
| 369605 ||  || — || February 5, 2000 || Kitt Peak || Spacewatch || EOS || align=right | 2.3 km || 
|-id=606 bgcolor=#E9E9E9
| 369606 ||  || — || March 26, 2007 || Mount Lemmon || Mount Lemmon Survey || HEN || align=right data-sort-value="0.90" | 900 m || 
|-id=607 bgcolor=#d6d6d6
| 369607 ||  || — || January 30, 2011 || Haleakala || Pan-STARRS || EOS || align=right | 1.7 km || 
|-id=608 bgcolor=#E9E9E9
| 369608 ||  || — || September 12, 2004 || Kitt Peak || Spacewatch || GEF || align=right | 1.3 km || 
|-id=609 bgcolor=#fefefe
| 369609 ||  || — || July 5, 2005 || Kitt Peak || Spacewatch || MAS || align=right data-sort-value="0.87" | 870 m || 
|-id=610 bgcolor=#E9E9E9
| 369610 ||  || — || September 10, 2004 || Goodricke-Pigott || R. A. Tucker || — || align=right | 3.1 km || 
|-id=611 bgcolor=#E9E9E9
| 369611 ||  || — || September 6, 2004 || Siding Spring || SSS || — || align=right | 3.5 km || 
|-id=612 bgcolor=#E9E9E9
| 369612 ||  || — || October 25, 2005 || Catalina || CSS || — || align=right | 2.4 km || 
|-id=613 bgcolor=#d6d6d6
| 369613 ||  || — || February 4, 2005 || Anderson Mesa || LONEOS || URS || align=right | 4.7 km || 
|-id=614 bgcolor=#d6d6d6
| 369614 ||  || — || September 5, 2008 || Kitt Peak || Spacewatch || — || align=right | 3.7 km || 
|-id=615 bgcolor=#E9E9E9
| 369615 ||  || — || December 24, 2005 || Kitt Peak || Spacewatch || WIT || align=right | 1.1 km || 
|-id=616 bgcolor=#E9E9E9
| 369616 ||  || — || February 22, 2002 || Palomar || NEAT || — || align=right | 3.1 km || 
|-id=617 bgcolor=#d6d6d6
| 369617 ||  || — || September 20, 2003 || Palomar || NEAT || EOS || align=right | 2.0 km || 
|-id=618 bgcolor=#d6d6d6
| 369618 ||  || — || October 18, 2003 || Palomar || NEAT || EOS || align=right | 2.3 km || 
|-id=619 bgcolor=#d6d6d6
| 369619 ||  || — || February 24, 2006 || Kitt Peak || Spacewatch || HYG || align=right | 2.9 km || 
|-id=620 bgcolor=#d6d6d6
| 369620 ||  || — || October 22, 2003 || Apache Point || SDSS || — || align=right | 3.9 km || 
|-id=621 bgcolor=#d6d6d6
| 369621 ||  || — || November 20, 2004 || Kitt Peak || Spacewatch || EOS || align=right | 2.4 km || 
|-id=622 bgcolor=#E9E9E9
| 369622 ||  || — || January 6, 2006 || Kitt Peak || Spacewatch || HOF || align=right | 2.4 km || 
|-id=623 bgcolor=#d6d6d6
| 369623 ||  || — || August 30, 2008 || Pises || C. Demeautis, J.-M. Lopez || TIR || align=right | 3.0 km || 
|-id=624 bgcolor=#d6d6d6
| 369624 ||  || — || February 9, 2010 || WISE || WISE || — || align=right | 3.8 km || 
|-id=625 bgcolor=#d6d6d6
| 369625 ||  || — || August 23, 2003 || Cerro Tololo || M. W. Buie || — || align=right | 2.9 km || 
|-id=626 bgcolor=#E9E9E9
| 369626 ||  || — || October 16, 2009 || Socorro || LINEAR || — || align=right | 3.5 km || 
|-id=627 bgcolor=#d6d6d6
| 369627 ||  || — || March 11, 2005 || Mount Lemmon || Mount Lemmon Survey || — || align=right | 2.7 km || 
|-id=628 bgcolor=#d6d6d6
| 369628 ||  || — || September 4, 2008 || Kitt Peak || Spacewatch || — || align=right | 2.9 km || 
|-id=629 bgcolor=#d6d6d6
| 369629 ||  || — || September 7, 2008 || Mount Lemmon || Mount Lemmon Survey || — || align=right | 2.9 km || 
|-id=630 bgcolor=#d6d6d6
| 369630 ||  || — || September 18, 2003 || Palomar || NEAT || — || align=right | 3.6 km || 
|-id=631 bgcolor=#d6d6d6
| 369631 ||  || — || August 21, 2008 || Kitt Peak || Spacewatch || KOR || align=right | 1.6 km || 
|-id=632 bgcolor=#E9E9E9
| 369632 ||  || — || September 17, 2009 || Catalina || CSS || — || align=right | 1.7 km || 
|-id=633 bgcolor=#d6d6d6
| 369633 ||  || — || February 22, 2006 || Catalina || CSS || — || align=right | 2.5 km || 
|-id=634 bgcolor=#d6d6d6
| 369634 ||  || — || February 16, 2010 || WISE || WISE || — || align=right | 4.7 km || 
|-id=635 bgcolor=#d6d6d6
| 369635 ||  || — || March 5, 2006 || Anderson Mesa || LONEOS || — || align=right | 4.1 km || 
|-id=636 bgcolor=#d6d6d6
| 369636 ||  || — || September 22, 2003 || Anderson Mesa || LONEOS || — || align=right | 3.2 km || 
|-id=637 bgcolor=#d6d6d6
| 369637 ||  || — || December 20, 2004 || Mount Lemmon || Mount Lemmon Survey || — || align=right | 4.1 km || 
|-id=638 bgcolor=#d6d6d6
| 369638 ||  || — || August 6, 2008 || Siding Spring || SSS || BRA || align=right | 2.8 km || 
|-id=639 bgcolor=#E9E9E9
| 369639 ||  || — || September 11, 2004 || Kitt Peak || Spacewatch || GEF || align=right | 1.2 km || 
|-id=640 bgcolor=#d6d6d6
| 369640 ||  || — || November 27, 2009 || Mount Lemmon || Mount Lemmon Survey || — || align=right | 3.6 km || 
|-id=641 bgcolor=#d6d6d6
| 369641 ||  || — || March 2, 2006 || Kitt Peak || Spacewatch || — || align=right | 2.9 km || 
|-id=642 bgcolor=#d6d6d6
| 369642 ||  || — || February 14, 2005 || Kitt Peak || Spacewatch || EOS || align=right | 2.7 km || 
|-id=643 bgcolor=#E9E9E9
| 369643 ||  || — || January 23, 2006 || Catalina || CSS || — || align=right | 2.8 km || 
|-id=644 bgcolor=#d6d6d6
| 369644 ||  || — || December 17, 2003 || Socorro || LINEAR || — || align=right | 4.3 km || 
|-id=645 bgcolor=#d6d6d6
| 369645 ||  || — || April 9, 2006 || Kitt Peak || Spacewatch || — || align=right | 2.8 km || 
|-id=646 bgcolor=#d6d6d6
| 369646 ||  || — || November 30, 2003 || Kitt Peak || Spacewatch || — || align=right | 3.3 km || 
|-id=647 bgcolor=#E9E9E9
| 369647 ||  || — || April 19, 2007 || Kitt Peak || Spacewatch || — || align=right | 3.4 km || 
|-id=648 bgcolor=#d6d6d6
| 369648 ||  || — || April 5, 2000 || Kitt Peak || Spacewatch || — || align=right | 3.7 km || 
|-id=649 bgcolor=#E9E9E9
| 369649 ||  || — || January 2, 2006 || Catalina || CSS || — || align=right | 3.1 km || 
|-id=650 bgcolor=#E9E9E9
| 369650 ||  || — || August 16, 2009 || Kitt Peak || Spacewatch || — || align=right | 2.8 km || 
|-id=651 bgcolor=#d6d6d6
| 369651 ||  || — || October 8, 2008 || Kitt Peak || Spacewatch || — || align=right | 3.1 km || 
|-id=652 bgcolor=#E9E9E9
| 369652 ||  || — || December 18, 2004 || Mount Lemmon || Mount Lemmon Survey || — || align=right | 2.7 km || 
|-id=653 bgcolor=#d6d6d6
| 369653 ||  || — || April 2, 2000 || Kitt Peak || Spacewatch || THM || align=right | 2.5 km || 
|-id=654 bgcolor=#d6d6d6
| 369654 ||  || — || September 29, 2008 || Mount Lemmon || Mount Lemmon Survey || EOS || align=right | 1.9 km || 
|-id=655 bgcolor=#d6d6d6
| 369655 ||  || — || October 3, 2003 || Kitt Peak || Spacewatch || — || align=right | 4.0 km || 
|-id=656 bgcolor=#d6d6d6
| 369656 ||  || — || December 2, 2004 || Kitt Peak || Spacewatch || — || align=right | 3.6 km || 
|-id=657 bgcolor=#d6d6d6
| 369657 ||  || — || March 5, 2006 || Kitt Peak || Spacewatch || — || align=right | 3.0 km || 
|-id=658 bgcolor=#d6d6d6
| 369658 ||  || — || October 3, 2003 || Kitt Peak || Spacewatch || — || align=right | 3.8 km || 
|-id=659 bgcolor=#d6d6d6
| 369659 ||  || — || November 9, 1999 || Socorro || LINEAR || K-2 || align=right | 1.6 km || 
|-id=660 bgcolor=#d6d6d6
| 369660 ||  || — || September 28, 2003 || Kitt Peak || Spacewatch || — || align=right | 2.5 km || 
|-id=661 bgcolor=#d6d6d6
| 369661 ||  || — || October 20, 2003 || Kitt Peak || Spacewatch || — || align=right | 3.1 km || 
|-id=662 bgcolor=#d6d6d6
| 369662 ||  || — || April 5, 2000 || Socorro || LINEAR || — || align=right | 3.9 km || 
|-id=663 bgcolor=#d6d6d6
| 369663 ||  || — || October 30, 2002 || Apache Point || SDSS || — || align=right | 3.6 km || 
|-id=664 bgcolor=#d6d6d6
| 369664 ||  || — || September 4, 2008 || Kitt Peak || Spacewatch || — || align=right | 4.2 km || 
|-id=665 bgcolor=#E9E9E9
| 369665 ||  || — || October 9, 1999 || Socorro || LINEAR || — || align=right | 3.2 km || 
|-id=666 bgcolor=#d6d6d6
| 369666 ||  || — || March 17, 2005 || Kitt Peak || Spacewatch || — || align=right | 4.4 km || 
|-id=667 bgcolor=#fefefe
| 369667 ||  || — || November 1, 2005 || Mount Lemmon || Mount Lemmon Survey || V || align=right data-sort-value="0.83" | 830 m || 
|-id=668 bgcolor=#d6d6d6
| 369668 ||  || — || September 14, 2002 || Palomar || NEAT || EUP || align=right | 3.9 km || 
|-id=669 bgcolor=#d6d6d6
| 369669 ||  || — || September 28, 2003 || Kitt Peak || Spacewatch || — || align=right | 3.1 km || 
|-id=670 bgcolor=#E9E9E9
| 369670 ||  || — || April 22, 2007 || Mount Lemmon || Mount Lemmon Survey || — || align=right data-sort-value="0.81" | 810 m || 
|-id=671 bgcolor=#d6d6d6
| 369671 ||  || — || November 5, 2002 || Kitt Peak || Spacewatch || EOS || align=right | 3.0 km || 
|-id=672 bgcolor=#fefefe
| 369672 ||  || — || September 20, 2001 || Socorro || LINEAR || — || align=right data-sort-value="0.66" | 660 m || 
|-id=673 bgcolor=#fefefe
| 369673 ||  || — || April 19, 2007 || Lulin Observatory || Lulin Obs. || — || align=right data-sort-value="0.92" | 920 m || 
|-id=674 bgcolor=#fefefe
| 369674 ||  || — || March 19, 2010 || Kitt Peak || Spacewatch || — || align=right | 2.2 km || 
|-id=675 bgcolor=#fefefe
| 369675 ||  || — || October 6, 2000 || Anderson Mesa || LONEOS || NYS || align=right data-sort-value="0.64" | 640 m || 
|-id=676 bgcolor=#FA8072
| 369676 ||  || — || July 12, 2001 || Palomar || NEAT || H || align=right data-sort-value="0.75" | 750 m || 
|-id=677 bgcolor=#d6d6d6
| 369677 ||  || — || February 4, 2003 || La Silla || C. Barbieri || CHA || align=right | 2.2 km || 
|-id=678 bgcolor=#E9E9E9
| 369678 ||  || — || December 28, 2003 || Anderson Mesa || LONEOS || — || align=right | 1.0 km || 
|-id=679 bgcolor=#E9E9E9
| 369679 ||  || — || April 20, 2009 || Mount Lemmon || Mount Lemmon Survey || EUN || align=right | 1.3 km || 
|-id=680 bgcolor=#fefefe
| 369680 ||  || — || September 3, 2005 || Palomar || NEAT || H || align=right data-sort-value="0.62" | 620 m || 
|-id=681 bgcolor=#fefefe
| 369681 ||  || — || September 18, 2002 || Anderson Mesa || LONEOS || H || align=right data-sort-value="0.99" | 990 m || 
|-id=682 bgcolor=#fefefe
| 369682 ||  || — || March 26, 2006 || Kitt Peak || Spacewatch || — || align=right data-sort-value="0.63" | 630 m || 
|-id=683 bgcolor=#fefefe
| 369683 ||  || — || January 7, 2005 || Catalina || CSS || — || align=right | 2.0 km || 
|-id=684 bgcolor=#fefefe
| 369684 ||  || — || January 29, 2004 || Socorro || LINEAR || H || align=right data-sort-value="0.70" | 700 m || 
|-id=685 bgcolor=#fefefe
| 369685 ||  || — || February 21, 2002 || Kitt Peak || Spacewatch || — || align=right data-sort-value="0.75" | 750 m || 
|-id=686 bgcolor=#fefefe
| 369686 ||  || — || October 14, 1999 || Socorro || LINEAR || — || align=right | 1.1 km || 
|-id=687 bgcolor=#fefefe
| 369687 ||  || — || June 13, 2005 || Mount Lemmon || Mount Lemmon Survey || — || align=right data-sort-value="0.87" | 870 m || 
|-id=688 bgcolor=#fefefe
| 369688 ||  || — || February 2, 2005 || Kitt Peak || Spacewatch || FLO || align=right data-sort-value="0.70" | 700 m || 
|-id=689 bgcolor=#fefefe
| 369689 ||  || — || May 17, 2009 || Mount Lemmon || Mount Lemmon Survey || — || align=right data-sort-value="0.72" | 720 m || 
|-id=690 bgcolor=#fefefe
| 369690 ||  || — || October 31, 2005 || Catalina || CSS || H || align=right | 1.1 km || 
|-id=691 bgcolor=#fefefe
| 369691 ||  || — || February 13, 2002 || Apache Point || SDSS || — || align=right data-sort-value="0.81" | 810 m || 
|-id=692 bgcolor=#fefefe
| 369692 ||  || — || May 24, 2006 || Palomar || NEAT || — || align=right | 1.1 km || 
|-id=693 bgcolor=#fefefe
| 369693 ||  || — || February 2, 2005 || Kitt Peak || Spacewatch || — || align=right | 1.1 km || 
|-id=694 bgcolor=#fefefe
| 369694 ||  || — || July 25, 2006 || Palomar || NEAT || V || align=right data-sort-value="0.75" | 750 m || 
|-id=695 bgcolor=#d6d6d6
| 369695 ||  || — || May 8, 1997 || Kitt Peak || Spacewatch || — || align=right | 3.8 km || 
|-id=696 bgcolor=#fefefe
| 369696 ||  || — || December 30, 2007 || Kitt Peak || Spacewatch || NYS || align=right data-sort-value="0.76" | 760 m || 
|-id=697 bgcolor=#fefefe
| 369697 ||  || — || April 15, 2005 || Kitt Peak || Spacewatch || NYS || align=right data-sort-value="0.62" | 620 m || 
|-id=698 bgcolor=#E9E9E9
| 369698 ||  || — || March 6, 2008 || Mount Lemmon || Mount Lemmon Survey || — || align=right | 1.6 km || 
|-id=699 bgcolor=#fefefe
| 369699 ||  || — || October 29, 2003 || Kitt Peak || Spacewatch || — || align=right data-sort-value="0.98" | 980 m || 
|-id=700 bgcolor=#fefefe
| 369700 ||  || — || September 17, 2010 || Mount Lemmon || Mount Lemmon Survey || — || align=right data-sort-value="0.65" | 650 m || 
|}

369701–369800 

|-bgcolor=#fefefe
| 369701 ||  || — || February 2, 2005 || Kitt Peak || Spacewatch || — || align=right data-sort-value="0.85" | 850 m || 
|-id=702 bgcolor=#fefefe
| 369702 ||  || — || September 4, 2010 || Mount Lemmon || Mount Lemmon Survey || V || align=right data-sort-value="0.51" | 510 m || 
|-id=703 bgcolor=#fefefe
| 369703 ||  || — || November 2, 2007 || Mount Lemmon || Mount Lemmon Survey || — || align=right data-sort-value="0.71" | 710 m || 
|-id=704 bgcolor=#E9E9E9
| 369704 ||  || — || August 27, 2009 || Kitt Peak || Spacewatch || — || align=right | 2.5 km || 
|-id=705 bgcolor=#fefefe
| 369705 ||  || — || July 30, 2000 || Cerro Tololo || M. W. Buie || FLO || align=right data-sort-value="0.80" | 800 m || 
|-id=706 bgcolor=#fefefe
| 369706 ||  || — || September 20, 2003 || Palomar || NEAT || — || align=right | 1.0 km || 
|-id=707 bgcolor=#d6d6d6
| 369707 ||  || — || March 13, 1996 || Kitt Peak || Spacewatch || — || align=right | 2.6 km || 
|-id=708 bgcolor=#E9E9E9
| 369708 ||  || — || February 9, 2007 || Kitt Peak || Spacewatch || — || align=right | 2.0 km || 
|-id=709 bgcolor=#E9E9E9
| 369709 ||  || — || October 27, 2005 || Kitt Peak || Spacewatch || — || align=right | 2.8 km || 
|-id=710 bgcolor=#fefefe
| 369710 ||  || — || December 14, 2007 || Mount Lemmon || Mount Lemmon Survey || — || align=right data-sort-value="0.73" | 730 m || 
|-id=711 bgcolor=#E9E9E9
| 369711 ||  || — || April 28, 2003 || Anderson Mesa || LONEOS || DOR || align=right | 3.8 km || 
|-id=712 bgcolor=#fefefe
| 369712 ||  || — || May 12, 2005 || Catalina || CSS || — || align=right | 1.1 km || 
|-id=713 bgcolor=#d6d6d6
| 369713 ||  || — || September 4, 2008 || Kitt Peak || Spacewatch || LIX || align=right | 3.2 km || 
|-id=714 bgcolor=#E9E9E9
| 369714 ||  || — || April 25, 2008 || Kitt Peak || Spacewatch || — || align=right | 1.6 km || 
|-id=715 bgcolor=#fefefe
| 369715 ||  || — || March 3, 2005 || Catalina || CSS || — || align=right data-sort-value="0.85" | 850 m || 
|-id=716 bgcolor=#fefefe
| 369716 ||  || — || April 18, 2002 || Kitt Peak || Spacewatch || — || align=right data-sort-value="0.79" | 790 m || 
|-id=717 bgcolor=#fefefe
| 369717 ||  || — || February 7, 2008 || Kitt Peak || Spacewatch || V || align=right data-sort-value="0.87" | 870 m || 
|-id=718 bgcolor=#fefefe
| 369718 ||  || — || August 31, 2003 || Kitt Peak || Spacewatch || — || align=right data-sort-value="0.74" | 740 m || 
|-id=719 bgcolor=#fefefe
| 369719 ||  || — || February 16, 2001 || Anderson Mesa || LONEOS || MAS || align=right data-sort-value="0.76" | 760 m || 
|-id=720 bgcolor=#E9E9E9
| 369720 ||  || — || March 2, 2008 || Kitt Peak || Spacewatch || — || align=right data-sort-value="0.99" | 990 m || 
|-id=721 bgcolor=#d6d6d6
| 369721 ||  || — || November 6, 2010 || Mount Lemmon || Mount Lemmon Survey || — || align=right | 3.1 km || 
|-id=722 bgcolor=#E9E9E9
| 369722 ||  || — || March 18, 2004 || Siding Spring || SSS || — || align=right | 3.3 km || 
|-id=723 bgcolor=#E9E9E9
| 369723 ||  || — || February 22, 2012 || Catalina || CSS || — || align=right | 2.7 km || 
|-id=724 bgcolor=#fefefe
| 369724 ||  || — || February 1, 2005 || Kitt Peak || Spacewatch || FLO || align=right data-sort-value="0.67" | 670 m || 
|-id=725 bgcolor=#fefefe
| 369725 ||  || — || October 15, 2004 || Mount Lemmon || Mount Lemmon Survey || — || align=right data-sort-value="0.64" | 640 m || 
|-id=726 bgcolor=#E9E9E9
| 369726 ||  || — || January 27, 2007 || Mount Lemmon || Mount Lemmon Survey || — || align=right | 1.8 km || 
|-id=727 bgcolor=#E9E9E9
| 369727 ||  || — || February 15, 2007 || Catalina || CSS || POS || align=right | 4.1 km || 
|-id=728 bgcolor=#E9E9E9
| 369728 ||  || — || October 13, 2010 || Mount Lemmon || Mount Lemmon Survey || — || align=right | 1.6 km || 
|-id=729 bgcolor=#fefefe
| 369729 ||  || — || January 30, 2008 || Kitt Peak || Spacewatch || — || align=right data-sort-value="0.87" | 870 m || 
|-id=730 bgcolor=#fefefe
| 369730 ||  || — || October 13, 2006 || Kitt Peak || Spacewatch || — || align=right data-sort-value="0.88" | 880 m || 
|-id=731 bgcolor=#E9E9E9
| 369731 ||  || — || March 20, 1999 || Apache Point || SDSS || — || align=right | 2.4 km || 
|-id=732 bgcolor=#fefefe
| 369732 ||  || — || February 7, 1997 || Kitt Peak || Spacewatch || — || align=right data-sort-value="0.94" | 940 m || 
|-id=733 bgcolor=#d6d6d6
| 369733 ||  || — || April 15, 2007 || Catalina || CSS || — || align=right | 3.4 km || 
|-id=734 bgcolor=#d6d6d6
| 369734 ||  || — || January 5, 2006 || Kitt Peak || Spacewatch || — || align=right | 2.6 km || 
|-id=735 bgcolor=#fefefe
| 369735 ||  || — || February 24, 2008 || Mount Lemmon || Mount Lemmon Survey || — || align=right | 1.2 km || 
|-id=736 bgcolor=#d6d6d6
| 369736 ||  || — || January 19, 2001 || Socorro || LINEAR || — || align=right | 3.6 km || 
|-id=737 bgcolor=#fefefe
| 369737 ||  || — || November 1, 2006 || Mount Lemmon || Mount Lemmon Survey || — || align=right data-sort-value="0.91" | 910 m || 
|-id=738 bgcolor=#E9E9E9
| 369738 ||  || — || September 26, 1995 || Kitt Peak || Spacewatch || INO || align=right | 1.1 km || 
|-id=739 bgcolor=#fefefe
| 369739 ||  || — || November 3, 2007 || Kitt Peak || Spacewatch || FLO || align=right data-sort-value="0.49" | 490 m || 
|-id=740 bgcolor=#fefefe
| 369740 ||  || — || February 9, 2005 || Kitt Peak || Spacewatch || FLO || align=right data-sort-value="0.65" | 650 m || 
|-id=741 bgcolor=#E9E9E9
| 369741 ||  || — || August 31, 2005 || Kitt Peak || Spacewatch || KON || align=right | 3.2 km || 
|-id=742 bgcolor=#fefefe
| 369742 ||  || — || November 18, 2003 || Kitt Peak || Spacewatch || FLO || align=right data-sort-value="0.67" | 670 m || 
|-id=743 bgcolor=#fefefe
| 369743 ||  || — || December 3, 2002 || Palomar || NEAT || — || align=right | 1.5 km || 
|-id=744 bgcolor=#fefefe
| 369744 ||  || — || March 4, 2005 || Mount Lemmon || Mount Lemmon Survey || — || align=right data-sort-value="0.80" | 800 m || 
|-id=745 bgcolor=#E9E9E9
| 369745 ||  || — || August 28, 2005 || Kitt Peak || Spacewatch || — || align=right | 1.4 km || 
|-id=746 bgcolor=#fefefe
| 369746 ||  || — || October 3, 2003 || Kitt Peak || Spacewatch || — || align=right data-sort-value="0.84" | 840 m || 
|-id=747 bgcolor=#d6d6d6
| 369747 ||  || — || September 30, 2003 || Kitt Peak || Spacewatch || — || align=right | 2.5 km || 
|-id=748 bgcolor=#E9E9E9
| 369748 ||  || — || August 31, 2005 || Kitt Peak || Spacewatch || EUN || align=right | 1.3 km || 
|-id=749 bgcolor=#fefefe
| 369749 ||  || — || July 10, 2005 || Siding Spring || SSS || MAS || align=right | 1.1 km || 
|-id=750 bgcolor=#fefefe
| 369750 ||  || — || March 13, 2002 || Kitt Peak || Spacewatch || — || align=right | 1.2 km || 
|-id=751 bgcolor=#E9E9E9
| 369751 ||  || — || December 15, 2006 || Kitt Peak || Spacewatch || — || align=right | 1.2 km || 
|-id=752 bgcolor=#E9E9E9
| 369752 ||  || — || September 15, 2009 || Mount Lemmon || Mount Lemmon Survey || — || align=right data-sort-value="0.87" | 870 m || 
|-id=753 bgcolor=#d6d6d6
| 369753 ||  || — || March 21, 2001 || Kitt Peak || Spacewatch || — || align=right | 2.7 km || 
|-id=754 bgcolor=#d6d6d6
| 369754 ||  || — || November 18, 2009 || Kitt Peak || Spacewatch || — || align=right | 4.2 km || 
|-id=755 bgcolor=#fefefe
| 369755 ||  || — || December 22, 2003 || Kitt Peak || Spacewatch || — || align=right data-sort-value="0.98" | 980 m || 
|-id=756 bgcolor=#E9E9E9
| 369756 ||  || — || May 9, 2008 || Siding Spring || SSS || — || align=right | 1.6 km || 
|-id=757 bgcolor=#E9E9E9
| 369757 ||  || — || November 23, 2006 || Kitt Peak || Spacewatch || — || align=right | 1.8 km || 
|-id=758 bgcolor=#E9E9E9
| 369758 ||  || — || April 16, 2004 || Siding Spring || SSS || — || align=right | 1.2 km || 
|-id=759 bgcolor=#d6d6d6
| 369759 ||  || — || June 10, 2007 || Siding Spring || SSS || — || align=right | 3.0 km || 
|-id=760 bgcolor=#E9E9E9
| 369760 ||  || — || September 25, 2000 || Kitt Peak || Spacewatch || GEF || align=right | 1.8 km || 
|-id=761 bgcolor=#d6d6d6
| 369761 ||  || — || January 30, 2011 || Mount Lemmon || Mount Lemmon Survey || EUP || align=right | 4.7 km || 
|-id=762 bgcolor=#fefefe
| 369762 ||  || — || March 9, 2005 || Mount Lemmon || Mount Lemmon Survey || — || align=right data-sort-value="0.80" | 800 m || 
|-id=763 bgcolor=#fefefe
| 369763 ||  || — || March 15, 2002 || Palomar || NEAT || — || align=right data-sort-value="0.86" | 860 m || 
|-id=764 bgcolor=#fefefe
| 369764 ||  || — || January 17, 1998 || Caussols || ODAS || NYS || align=right data-sort-value="0.66" | 660 m || 
|-id=765 bgcolor=#fefefe
| 369765 ||  || — || March 15, 2001 || Kitt Peak || Spacewatch || NYS || align=right data-sort-value="0.95" | 950 m || 
|-id=766 bgcolor=#E9E9E9
| 369766 ||  || — || February 9, 2003 || Palomar || NEAT || — || align=right | 2.0 km || 
|-id=767 bgcolor=#fefefe
| 369767 ||  || — || November 23, 2003 || Kitt Peak || Spacewatch || V || align=right data-sort-value="0.65" | 650 m || 
|-id=768 bgcolor=#E9E9E9
| 369768 ||  || — || April 26, 2003 || Kitt Peak || Spacewatch || — || align=right | 2.0 km || 
|-id=769 bgcolor=#fefefe
| 369769 ||  || — || March 10, 2005 || Mount Lemmon || Mount Lemmon Survey || V || align=right data-sort-value="0.68" | 680 m || 
|-id=770 bgcolor=#d6d6d6
| 369770 ||  || — || April 16, 2007 || Catalina || CSS || BRA || align=right | 2.0 km || 
|-id=771 bgcolor=#E9E9E9
| 369771 ||  || — || February 9, 2003 || Palomar || NEAT || — || align=right | 2.0 km || 
|-id=772 bgcolor=#E9E9E9
| 369772 ||  || — || April 4, 2008 || Mount Lemmon || Mount Lemmon Survey || — || align=right | 1.4 km || 
|-id=773 bgcolor=#d6d6d6
| 369773 ||  || — || February 27, 2006 || Kitt Peak || Spacewatch || URS || align=right | 4.3 km || 
|-id=774 bgcolor=#E9E9E9
| 369774 ||  || — || December 16, 2006 || Mount Lemmon || Mount Lemmon Survey || — || align=right | 1.9 km || 
|-id=775 bgcolor=#E9E9E9
| 369775 ||  || — || April 21, 2004 || Socorro || LINEAR || EUN || align=right | 1.7 km || 
|-id=776 bgcolor=#E9E9E9
| 369776 ||  || — || May 6, 2008 || Siding Spring || SSS || — || align=right | 1.4 km || 
|-id=777 bgcolor=#d6d6d6
| 369777 ||  || — || August 24, 2008 || Kitt Peak || Spacewatch || — || align=right | 3.6 km || 
|-id=778 bgcolor=#E9E9E9
| 369778 ||  || — || October 27, 2005 || Mount Lemmon || Mount Lemmon Survey || — || align=right | 1.2 km || 
|-id=779 bgcolor=#E9E9E9
| 369779 ||  || — || October 30, 2005 || Kitt Peak || Spacewatch || WIT || align=right | 1.1 km || 
|-id=780 bgcolor=#d6d6d6
| 369780 ||  || — || January 23, 2006 || Kitt Peak || Spacewatch || — || align=right | 3.3 km || 
|-id=781 bgcolor=#d6d6d6
| 369781 ||  || — || April 18, 2007 || Mount Lemmon || Mount Lemmon Survey || — || align=right | 2.9 km || 
|-id=782 bgcolor=#fefefe
| 369782 ||  || — || March 8, 2005 || Mount Lemmon || Mount Lemmon Survey || — || align=right data-sort-value="0.87" | 870 m || 
|-id=783 bgcolor=#fefefe
| 369783 ||  || — || October 26, 2003 || Kitt Peak || Spacewatch || NYS || align=right data-sort-value="0.68" | 680 m || 
|-id=784 bgcolor=#E9E9E9
| 369784 ||  || — || March 15, 2008 || Mount Lemmon || Mount Lemmon Survey || — || align=right | 1.0 km || 
|-id=785 bgcolor=#E9E9E9
| 369785 ||  || — || April 30, 2004 || Kitt Peak || Spacewatch || — || align=right | 1.0 km || 
|-id=786 bgcolor=#d6d6d6
| 369786 ||  || — || May 11, 2007 || Mount Lemmon || Mount Lemmon Survey || EMA || align=right | 2.7 km || 
|-id=787 bgcolor=#d6d6d6
| 369787 ||  || — || January 5, 2010 || Kitt Peak || Spacewatch || EOS || align=right | 2.9 km || 
|-id=788 bgcolor=#d6d6d6
| 369788 ||  || — || September 27, 2009 || Mount Lemmon || Mount Lemmon Survey || — || align=right | 3.6 km || 
|-id=789 bgcolor=#d6d6d6
| 369789 ||  || — || September 27, 2009 || Mount Lemmon || Mount Lemmon Survey || — || align=right | 3.1 km || 
|-id=790 bgcolor=#d6d6d6
| 369790 ||  || — || September 27, 2003 || Apache Point || SDSS || — || align=right | 3.5 km || 
|-id=791 bgcolor=#d6d6d6
| 369791 ||  || — || February 24, 2006 || Kitt Peak || Spacewatch || — || align=right | 2.7 km || 
|-id=792 bgcolor=#d6d6d6
| 369792 ||  || — || February 12, 2011 || Mount Lemmon || Mount Lemmon Survey || — || align=right | 3.3 km || 
|-id=793 bgcolor=#d6d6d6
| 369793 ||  || — || June 27, 1998 || Kitt Peak || Spacewatch || — || align=right | 3.1 km || 
|-id=794 bgcolor=#E9E9E9
| 369794 ||  || — || February 17, 2007 || Catalina || CSS || — || align=right | 3.2 km || 
|-id=795 bgcolor=#d6d6d6
| 369795 ||  || — || February 20, 2006 || Kitt Peak || Spacewatch || — || align=right | 3.6 km || 
|-id=796 bgcolor=#d6d6d6
| 369796 ||  || — || June 11, 1996 || Kitt Peak || Spacewatch || — || align=right | 3.0 km || 
|-id=797 bgcolor=#E9E9E9
| 369797 ||  || — || October 18, 1995 || Kitt Peak || Spacewatch || — || align=right | 2.2 km || 
|-id=798 bgcolor=#E9E9E9
| 369798 ||  || — || September 13, 2005 || Kitt Peak || Spacewatch || — || align=right | 1.2 km || 
|-id=799 bgcolor=#E9E9E9
| 369799 ||  || — || July 5, 2005 || Kitt Peak || Spacewatch || EUN || align=right | 1.7 km || 
|-id=800 bgcolor=#d6d6d6
| 369800 ||  || — || November 19, 2008 || Dauban || F. Kugel || LIX || align=right | 4.6 km || 
|}

369801–369900 

|-bgcolor=#d6d6d6
| 369801 ||  || — || September 6, 2008 || Mount Lemmon || Mount Lemmon Survey || — || align=right | 2.9 km || 
|-id=802 bgcolor=#d6d6d6
| 369802 ||  || — || February 2, 2006 || Kitt Peak || Spacewatch || — || align=right | 2.0 km || 
|-id=803 bgcolor=#d6d6d6
| 369803 ||  || — || March 9, 1995 || Kitt Peak || Spacewatch || — || align=right | 4.0 km || 
|-id=804 bgcolor=#E9E9E9
| 369804 ||  || — || October 1, 2005 || Kitt Peak || Spacewatch || — || align=right | 1.8 km || 
|-id=805 bgcolor=#d6d6d6
| 369805 ||  || — || September 3, 2008 || Kitt Peak || Spacewatch || — || align=right | 3.7 km || 
|-id=806 bgcolor=#d6d6d6
| 369806 ||  || — || August 24, 2008 || Kitt Peak || Spacewatch || TIR || align=right | 3.3 km || 
|-id=807 bgcolor=#E9E9E9
| 369807 ||  || — || August 28, 2000 || Cerro Tololo || M. W. Buie || — || align=right | 1.7 km || 
|-id=808 bgcolor=#d6d6d6
| 369808 ||  || — || September 22, 2003 || Kitt Peak || Spacewatch || EOS || align=right | 2.2 km || 
|-id=809 bgcolor=#E9E9E9
| 369809 ||  || — || February 17, 2007 || Kitt Peak || Spacewatch || NEM || align=right | 3.0 km || 
|-id=810 bgcolor=#E9E9E9
| 369810 ||  || — || June 13, 2004 || Kitt Peak || Spacewatch || — || align=right | 1.3 km || 
|-id=811 bgcolor=#E9E9E9
| 369811 ||  || — || September 16, 2009 || Kitt Peak || Spacewatch || — || align=right | 2.2 km || 
|-id=812 bgcolor=#E9E9E9
| 369812 ||  || — || August 9, 2004 || Socorro || LINEAR || — || align=right | 1.9 km || 
|-id=813 bgcolor=#d6d6d6
| 369813 ||  || — || October 29, 2003 || Kitt Peak || Spacewatch || — || align=right | 4.2 km || 
|-id=814 bgcolor=#d6d6d6
| 369814 ||  || — || April 16, 2001 || Kitt Peak || Spacewatch || EOS || align=right | 2.2 km || 
|-id=815 bgcolor=#fefefe
| 369815 ||  || — || February 12, 2004 || Kitt Peak || Spacewatch || NYS || align=right data-sort-value="0.71" | 710 m || 
|-id=816 bgcolor=#E9E9E9
| 369816 ||  || — || January 10, 2007 || Kitt Peak || Spacewatch || — || align=right | 2.0 km || 
|-id=817 bgcolor=#E9E9E9
| 369817 ||  || — || March 28, 2003 || Kitt Peak || Spacewatch || — || align=right | 2.4 km || 
|-id=818 bgcolor=#d6d6d6
| 369818 ||  || — || September 19, 2003 || Kitt Peak || Spacewatch || THM || align=right | 2.6 km || 
|-id=819 bgcolor=#d6d6d6
| 369819 ||  || — || January 30, 2011 || Haleakala || Pan-STARRS || 7:4 || align=right | 3.7 km || 
|-id=820 bgcolor=#d6d6d6
| 369820 ||  || — || April 25, 1995 || Kitt Peak || Spacewatch || ALA || align=right | 4.9 km || 
|-id=821 bgcolor=#E9E9E9
| 369821 ||  || — || August 28, 2005 || Kitt Peak || Spacewatch || — || align=right data-sort-value="0.89" | 890 m || 
|-id=822 bgcolor=#E9E9E9
| 369822 ||  || — || October 23, 2009 || Mount Lemmon || Mount Lemmon Survey || — || align=right | 3.1 km || 
|-id=823 bgcolor=#d6d6d6
| 369823 ||  || — || January 10, 2011 || Mount Lemmon || Mount Lemmon Survey || — || align=right | 2.8 km || 
|-id=824 bgcolor=#d6d6d6
| 369824 ||  || — || September 4, 2008 || Kitt Peak || Spacewatch || — || align=right | 3.0 km || 
|-id=825 bgcolor=#d6d6d6
| 369825 ||  || — || September 22, 2008 || Mount Lemmon || Mount Lemmon Survey || — || align=right | 2.7 km || 
|-id=826 bgcolor=#E9E9E9
| 369826 ||  || — || September 30, 2005 || Mount Lemmon || Mount Lemmon Survey || — || align=right | 1.9 km || 
|-id=827 bgcolor=#E9E9E9
| 369827 ||  || — || January 28, 1995 || Kitt Peak || Spacewatch || — || align=right | 1.2 km || 
|-id=828 bgcolor=#E9E9E9
| 369828 ||  || — || October 29, 2005 || Mount Lemmon || Mount Lemmon Survey || — || align=right | 1.3 km || 
|-id=829 bgcolor=#E9E9E9
| 369829 ||  || — || September 18, 2009 || Siding Spring || SSS || BAR || align=right | 1.7 km || 
|-id=830 bgcolor=#E9E9E9
| 369830 ||  || — || August 17, 2009 || Catalina || CSS || EUN || align=right | 1.6 km || 
|-id=831 bgcolor=#d6d6d6
| 369831 ||  || — || April 3, 2000 || Kitt Peak || Spacewatch || — || align=right | 3.5 km || 
|-id=832 bgcolor=#d6d6d6
| 369832 ||  || — || October 1, 2008 || Mount Lemmon || Mount Lemmon Survey || EUP || align=right | 6.3 km || 
|-id=833 bgcolor=#fefefe
| 369833 ||  || — || June 18, 2005 || Mount Lemmon || Mount Lemmon Survey || — || align=right | 1.0 km || 
|-id=834 bgcolor=#d6d6d6
| 369834 ||  || — || January 28, 2011 || Mount Lemmon || Mount Lemmon Survey || — || align=right | 3.9 km || 
|-id=835 bgcolor=#d6d6d6
| 369835 ||  || — || May 11, 2007 || Mount Lemmon || Mount Lemmon Survey || EOS || align=right | 1.9 km || 
|-id=836 bgcolor=#E9E9E9
| 369836 ||  || — || February 12, 2002 || Kitt Peak || Spacewatch || — || align=right | 2.1 km || 
|-id=837 bgcolor=#E9E9E9
| 369837 ||  || — || October 26, 2005 || Kitt Peak || Spacewatch || — || align=right | 1.6 km || 
|-id=838 bgcolor=#fefefe
| 369838 ||  || — || December 13, 2006 || Kitt Peak || Spacewatch || — || align=right | 1.1 km || 
|-id=839 bgcolor=#E9E9E9
| 369839 ||  || — || October 17, 1995 || Kitt Peak || Spacewatch || AGN || align=right | 1.5 km || 
|-id=840 bgcolor=#d6d6d6
| 369840 ||  || — || May 17, 2007 || Catalina || CSS || — || align=right | 3.8 km || 
|-id=841 bgcolor=#d6d6d6
| 369841 ||  || — || May 7, 2002 || Palomar || NEAT || CHA || align=right | 3.2 km || 
|-id=842 bgcolor=#d6d6d6
| 369842 ||  || — || September 21, 2003 || Kitt Peak || Spacewatch || — || align=right | 2.4 km || 
|-id=843 bgcolor=#d6d6d6
| 369843 ||  || — || January 31, 2006 || Kitt Peak || Spacewatch || KOR || align=right | 1.5 km || 
|-id=844 bgcolor=#fefefe
| 369844 ||  || — || April 1, 2005 || Kitt Peak || Spacewatch || — || align=right data-sort-value="0.76" | 760 m || 
|-id=845 bgcolor=#E9E9E9
| 369845 ||  || — || February 8, 2002 || Kitt Peak || M. W. Buie || AGN || align=right | 1.3 km || 
|-id=846 bgcolor=#E9E9E9
| 369846 ||  || — || May 28, 2008 || Mount Lemmon || Mount Lemmon Survey || — || align=right | 1.7 km || 
|-id=847 bgcolor=#d6d6d6
| 369847 ||  || — || May 4, 2006 || Mount Lemmon || Mount Lemmon Survey || HYG || align=right | 3.3 km || 
|-id=848 bgcolor=#E9E9E9
| 369848 ||  || — || November 8, 2009 || Mount Lemmon || Mount Lemmon Survey || — || align=right | 2.2 km || 
|-id=849 bgcolor=#E9E9E9
| 369849 ||  || — || March 24, 2003 || Kitt Peak || Spacewatch || — || align=right | 1.4 km || 
|-id=850 bgcolor=#E9E9E9
| 369850 ||  || — || October 24, 2005 || Kitt Peak || Spacewatch || — || align=right | 1.3 km || 
|-id=851 bgcolor=#E9E9E9
| 369851 ||  || — || September 28, 2009 || Mount Lemmon || Mount Lemmon Survey || — || align=right | 2.0 km || 
|-id=852 bgcolor=#E9E9E9
| 369852 ||  || — || August 30, 2005 || Kitt Peak || Spacewatch || — || align=right | 1.0 km || 
|-id=853 bgcolor=#E9E9E9
| 369853 ||  || — || October 25, 2009 || Kitt Peak || Spacewatch || — || align=right | 2.8 km || 
|-id=854 bgcolor=#E9E9E9
| 369854 ||  || — || September 15, 2009 || Kitt Peak || Spacewatch || AST || align=right | 2.3 km || 
|-id=855 bgcolor=#E9E9E9
| 369855 ||  || — || March 20, 2007 || Kitt Peak || Spacewatch || WIT || align=right | 1.1 km || 
|-id=856 bgcolor=#d6d6d6
| 369856 ||  || — || September 19, 2003 || Kitt Peak || Spacewatch || — || align=right | 3.0 km || 
|-id=857 bgcolor=#E9E9E9
| 369857 ||  || — || September 18, 1995 || Kitt Peak || Spacewatch || — || align=right | 3.5 km || 
|-id=858 bgcolor=#d6d6d6
| 369858 ||  || — || February 7, 2006 || Mount Lemmon || Mount Lemmon Survey || — || align=right | 2.7 km || 
|-id=859 bgcolor=#E9E9E9
| 369859 ||  || — || March 26, 2007 || Mount Lemmon || Mount Lemmon Survey || WIT || align=right | 1.1 km || 
|-id=860 bgcolor=#d6d6d6
| 369860 ||  || — || October 8, 2008 || Mount Lemmon || Mount Lemmon Survey || — || align=right | 3.7 km || 
|-id=861 bgcolor=#d6d6d6
| 369861 ||  || — || October 14, 1998 || Kitt Peak || Spacewatch || — || align=right | 2.8 km || 
|-id=862 bgcolor=#d6d6d6
| 369862 ||  || — || September 29, 2008 || Mount Lemmon || Mount Lemmon Survey || TEL || align=right | 1.6 km || 
|-id=863 bgcolor=#E9E9E9
| 369863 ||  || — || October 8, 2004 || Kitt Peak || Spacewatch || WIT || align=right data-sort-value="0.99" | 990 m || 
|-id=864 bgcolor=#E9E9E9
| 369864 ||  || — || October 24, 2005 || Mauna Kea || A. Boattini || AGN || align=right | 1.4 km || 
|-id=865 bgcolor=#d6d6d6
| 369865 ||  || — || March 5, 2006 || Anderson Mesa || LONEOS || — || align=right | 4.3 km || 
|-id=866 bgcolor=#E9E9E9
| 369866 ||  || — || April 1, 2008 || Kitt Peak || Spacewatch || — || align=right | 1.0 km || 
|-id=867 bgcolor=#d6d6d6
| 369867 ||  || — || November 16, 2009 || Mount Lemmon || Mount Lemmon Survey || 628 || align=right | 1.9 km || 
|-id=868 bgcolor=#E9E9E9
| 369868 ||  || — || February 23, 2007 || Kitt Peak || Spacewatch || — || align=right | 1.4 km || 
|-id=869 bgcolor=#E9E9E9
| 369869 ||  || — || October 1, 1995 || Kitt Peak || Spacewatch || HEN || align=right | 1.3 km || 
|-id=870 bgcolor=#d6d6d6
| 369870 ||  || — || September 21, 2003 || Kitt Peak || Spacewatch || EOS || align=right | 2.4 km || 
|-id=871 bgcolor=#d6d6d6
| 369871 ||  || — || August 15, 2002 || Kitt Peak || Spacewatch || — || align=right | 3.4 km || 
|-id=872 bgcolor=#E9E9E9
| 369872 ||  || — || July 30, 2005 || Palomar || NEAT || — || align=right | 1.0 km || 
|-id=873 bgcolor=#E9E9E9
| 369873 ||  || — || March 15, 2007 || Mount Lemmon || Mount Lemmon Survey || HOF || align=right | 4.3 km || 
|-id=874 bgcolor=#d6d6d6
| 369874 ||  || — || August 23, 2008 || Kitt Peak || Spacewatch || — || align=right | 4.1 km || 
|-id=875 bgcolor=#E9E9E9
| 369875 ||  || — || February 9, 2002 || Kitt Peak || Spacewatch || — || align=right | 3.0 km || 
|-id=876 bgcolor=#d6d6d6
| 369876 ||  || — || January 17, 2005 || Kitt Peak || Spacewatch || EOS || align=right | 2.6 km || 
|-id=877 bgcolor=#fefefe
| 369877 ||  || — || February 27, 2008 || Kitt Peak || Spacewatch || — || align=right data-sort-value="0.78" | 780 m || 
|-id=878 bgcolor=#d6d6d6
| 369878 ||  || — || February 25, 2006 || Mount Lemmon || Mount Lemmon Survey || — || align=right | 3.4 km || 
|-id=879 bgcolor=#E9E9E9
| 369879 ||  || — || September 3, 2005 || Palomar || NEAT || — || align=right | 1.3 km || 
|-id=880 bgcolor=#E9E9E9
| 369880 ||  || — || January 17, 2007 || Kitt Peak || Spacewatch || MAR || align=right | 1.2 km || 
|-id=881 bgcolor=#C2FFFF
| 369881 ||  || — || November 15, 2003 || Kitt Peak || Spacewatch || L5 || align=right | 12 km || 
|-id=882 bgcolor=#d6d6d6
| 369882 ||  || — || December 21, 2008 || Catalina || CSS || — || align=right | 4.2 km || 
|-id=883 bgcolor=#FA8072
| 369883 ||  || — || January 24, 2007 || Mount Lemmon || Mount Lemmon Survey || — || align=right data-sort-value="0.86" | 860 m || 
|-id=884 bgcolor=#E9E9E9
| 369884 ||  || — || October 11, 1999 || Socorro || LINEAR || — || align=right | 1.7 km || 
|-id=885 bgcolor=#E9E9E9
| 369885 ||  || — || February 25, 2006 || Mount Lemmon || Mount Lemmon Survey || WIT || align=right | 1.2 km || 
|-id=886 bgcolor=#C2FFFF
| 369886 ||  || — || February 28, 2005 || Catalina || CSS || L5 || align=right | 14 km || 
|-id=887 bgcolor=#E9E9E9
| 369887 ||  || — || October 3, 1999 || Socorro || LINEAR || — || align=right | 1.9 km || 
|-id=888 bgcolor=#fefefe
| 369888 ||  || — || March 26, 2007 || Mount Lemmon || Mount Lemmon Survey || V || align=right data-sort-value="0.74" | 740 m || 
|-id=889 bgcolor=#d6d6d6
| 369889 ||  || — || August 19, 2002 || Palomar || NEAT || — || align=right | 3.4 km || 
|-id=890 bgcolor=#E9E9E9
| 369890 ||  || — || February 8, 2002 || Palomar || NEAT || — || align=right | 1.5 km || 
|-id=891 bgcolor=#d6d6d6
| 369891 ||  || — || March 27, 2004 || Socorro || LINEAR || — || align=right | 4.7 km || 
|-id=892 bgcolor=#d6d6d6
| 369892 ||  || — || December 16, 2007 || Mount Lemmon || Mount Lemmon Survey || — || align=right | 3.3 km || 
|-id=893 bgcolor=#d6d6d6
| 369893 ||  || — || August 30, 2002 || Palomar || NEAT || — || align=right | 2.2 km || 
|-id=894 bgcolor=#fefefe
| 369894 ||  || — || October 28, 2005 || Mount Lemmon || Mount Lemmon Survey || — || align=right data-sort-value="0.98" | 980 m || 
|-id=895 bgcolor=#E9E9E9
| 369895 ||  || — || February 4, 2006 || Kitt Peak || Spacewatch || — || align=right | 1.6 km || 
|-id=896 bgcolor=#d6d6d6
| 369896 ||  || — || March 14, 2005 || Mount Lemmon || Mount Lemmon Survey || EOS || align=right | 2.4 km || 
|-id=897 bgcolor=#d6d6d6
| 369897 ||  || — || October 7, 2007 || Kitt Peak || Spacewatch || — || align=right | 3.1 km || 
|-id=898 bgcolor=#d6d6d6
| 369898 ||  || — || December 14, 2003 || Kitt Peak || Spacewatch || KOR || align=right | 1.5 km || 
|-id=899 bgcolor=#E9E9E9
| 369899 ||  || — || April 8, 2002 || Palomar || NEAT || — || align=right | 2.3 km || 
|-id=900 bgcolor=#fefefe
| 369900 ||  || — || March 14, 2004 || Kitt Peak || Spacewatch || NYS || align=right data-sort-value="0.53" | 530 m || 
|}

369901–370000 

|-bgcolor=#fefefe
| 369901 ||  || — || January 25, 2006 || Kitt Peak || Spacewatch || NYS || align=right data-sort-value="0.61" | 610 m || 
|-id=902 bgcolor=#E9E9E9
| 369902 ||  || — || March 3, 2005 || Catalina || CSS || GEF || align=right | 1.8 km || 
|-id=903 bgcolor=#fefefe
| 369903 ||  || — || April 19, 2007 || Mount Lemmon || Mount Lemmon Survey || — || align=right | 1.0 km || 
|-id=904 bgcolor=#d6d6d6
| 369904 ||  || — || April 9, 2010 || Mount Lemmon || Mount Lemmon Survey || THM || align=right | 3.2 km || 
|-id=905 bgcolor=#E9E9E9
| 369905 ||  || — || October 29, 2003 || Kitt Peak || Spacewatch || — || align=right | 1.7 km || 
|-id=906 bgcolor=#d6d6d6
| 369906 ||  || — || December 12, 2006 || Kitt Peak || Spacewatch || — || align=right | 3.8 km || 
|-id=907 bgcolor=#d6d6d6
| 369907 ||  || — || October 15, 2001 || Apache Point || SDSS || KOR || align=right | 1.7 km || 
|-id=908 bgcolor=#fefefe
| 369908 ||  || — || August 3, 2004 || Siding Spring || SSS || V || align=right data-sort-value="0.82" | 820 m || 
|-id=909 bgcolor=#d6d6d6
| 369909 ||  || — || May 26, 2003 || Kitt Peak || Spacewatch || — || align=right | 3.8 km || 
|-id=910 bgcolor=#E9E9E9
| 369910 ||  || — || December 1, 2003 || Kitt Peak || Spacewatch || — || align=right | 1.3 km || 
|-id=911 bgcolor=#E9E9E9
| 369911 ||  || — || October 4, 2002 || Apache Point || SDSS || EUN || align=right | 1.1 km || 
|-id=912 bgcolor=#d6d6d6
| 369912 ||  || — || October 7, 2004 || Kitt Peak || Spacewatch || THM || align=right | 2.7 km || 
|-id=913 bgcolor=#fefefe
| 369913 ||  || — || November 21, 2008 || Kitt Peak || Spacewatch || — || align=right data-sort-value="0.78" | 780 m || 
|-id=914 bgcolor=#E9E9E9
| 369914 ||  || — || August 19, 2002 || Palomar || NEAT || MAR || align=right | 1.4 km || 
|-id=915 bgcolor=#fefefe
| 369915 ||  || — || January 11, 1999 || Kitt Peak || Spacewatch || — || align=right data-sort-value="0.66" | 660 m || 
|-id=916 bgcolor=#d6d6d6
| 369916 ||  || — || December 26, 2005 || Marly || P. Kocher || SYL7:4 || align=right | 4.9 km || 
|-id=917 bgcolor=#C2FFFF
| 369917 ||  || — || January 12, 2000 || Kitt Peak || Spacewatch || L4 || align=right | 7.4 km || 
|-id=918 bgcolor=#E9E9E9
| 369918 ||  || — || October 5, 2002 || Palomar || NEAT || WIT || align=right data-sort-value="0.93" | 930 m || 
|-id=919 bgcolor=#E9E9E9
| 369919 ||  || — || April 9, 2005 || Kitt Peak || Spacewatch || — || align=right | 1.6 km || 
|-id=920 bgcolor=#E9E9E9
| 369920 ||  || — || January 13, 2008 || Kitt Peak || Spacewatch || — || align=right | 2.1 km || 
|-id=921 bgcolor=#E9E9E9
| 369921 ||  || — || August 4, 2005 || Palomar || NEAT || AGN || align=right | 1.5 km || 
|-id=922 bgcolor=#d6d6d6
| 369922 ||  || — || August 31, 2005 || Kitt Peak || Spacewatch || TIR || align=right | 2.9 km || 
|-id=923 bgcolor=#E9E9E9
| 369923 ||  || — || November 8, 2007 || Catalina || CSS || — || align=right | 1.4 km || 
|-id=924 bgcolor=#E9E9E9
| 369924 ||  || — || December 11, 2002 || Mount Graham || W. H. Ryan, L. Stewart || — || align=right | 2.6 km || 
|-id=925 bgcolor=#d6d6d6
| 369925 ||  || — || February 25, 2007 || Kitt Peak || Spacewatch || HYG || align=right | 3.3 km || 
|-id=926 bgcolor=#d6d6d6
| 369926 ||  || — || January 8, 2002 || Kitt Peak || Spacewatch || — || align=right | 3.7 km || 
|-id=927 bgcolor=#d6d6d6
| 369927 ||  || — || November 6, 2005 || Catalina || CSS || — || align=right | 5.8 km || 
|-id=928 bgcolor=#E9E9E9
| 369928 ||  || — || January 12, 2004 || Palomar || NEAT || — || align=right | 2.0 km || 
|-id=929 bgcolor=#E9E9E9
| 369929 ||  || — || April 1, 2005 || Kitt Peak || Spacewatch || — || align=right | 1.2 km || 
|-id=930 bgcolor=#d6d6d6
| 369930 ||  || — || August 31, 2005 || Kitt Peak || Spacewatch || NAE || align=right | 2.7 km || 
|-id=931 bgcolor=#d6d6d6
| 369931 ||  || — || September 7, 2004 || Kitt Peak || Spacewatch || — || align=right | 3.2 km || 
|-id=932 bgcolor=#d6d6d6
| 369932 ||  || — || May 4, 2008 || Kitt Peak || Spacewatch || — || align=right | 3.1 km || 
|-id=933 bgcolor=#E9E9E9
| 369933 ||  || — || March 31, 2009 || Mount Lemmon || Mount Lemmon Survey || — || align=right | 2.0 km || 
|-id=934 bgcolor=#fefefe
| 369934 ||  || — || September 16, 2006 || Catalina || CSS || H || align=right data-sort-value="0.65" | 650 m || 
|-id=935 bgcolor=#E9E9E9
| 369935 ||  || — || May 7, 2005 || Mount Lemmon || Mount Lemmon Survey || — || align=right data-sort-value="0.82" | 820 m || 
|-id=936 bgcolor=#E9E9E9
| 369936 ||  || — || April 13, 2004 || Kitt Peak || Spacewatch || WIT || align=right | 1.3 km || 
|-id=937 bgcolor=#E9E9E9
| 369937 ||  || — || November 2, 1997 || Kitt Peak || Spacewatch || — || align=right | 3.1 km || 
|-id=938 bgcolor=#E9E9E9
| 369938 ||  || — || July 12, 2001 || Palomar || NEAT || — || align=right | 1.1 km || 
|-id=939 bgcolor=#fefefe
| 369939 ||  || — || April 21, 1998 || Socorro || LINEAR || — || align=right data-sort-value="0.96" | 960 m || 
|-id=940 bgcolor=#d6d6d6
| 369940 ||  || — || April 14, 2007 || Catalina || CSS || EUP || align=right | 5.3 km || 
|-id=941 bgcolor=#d6d6d6
| 369941 ||  || — || April 10, 2002 || Palomar || NEAT || — || align=right | 3.3 km || 
|-id=942 bgcolor=#E9E9E9
| 369942 ||  || — || August 28, 2006 || Kitt Peak || Spacewatch || — || align=right | 2.0 km || 
|-id=943 bgcolor=#d6d6d6
| 369943 ||  || — || March 12, 2008 || Mount Lemmon || Mount Lemmon Survey || CHA || align=right | 2.6 km || 
|-id=944 bgcolor=#E9E9E9
| 369944 ||  || — || December 6, 2007 || Catalina || CSS || — || align=right | 3.6 km || 
|-id=945 bgcolor=#d6d6d6
| 369945 ||  || — || November 4, 2004 || Catalina || CSS || — || align=right | 4.3 km || 
|-id=946 bgcolor=#d6d6d6
| 369946 ||  || — || October 25, 2005 || Kitt Peak || Spacewatch || — || align=right | 3.1 km || 
|-id=947 bgcolor=#d6d6d6
| 369947 ||  || — || September 17, 2004 || Socorro || LINEAR || — || align=right | 4.0 km || 
|-id=948 bgcolor=#E9E9E9
| 369948 ||  || — || March 2, 2009 || Kitt Peak || Spacewatch || EUN || align=right | 1.3 km || 
|-id=949 bgcolor=#d6d6d6
| 369949 ||  || — || May 12, 2002 || Palomar || NEAT || TIR || align=right | 4.2 km || 
|-id=950 bgcolor=#fefefe
| 369950 ||  || — || May 24, 2006 || Mount Lemmon || Mount Lemmon Survey || V || align=right data-sort-value="0.89" | 890 m || 
|-id=951 bgcolor=#E9E9E9
| 369951 ||  || — || November 23, 2006 || Mount Lemmon || Mount Lemmon Survey || — || align=right | 2.2 km || 
|-id=952 bgcolor=#fefefe
| 369952 ||  || — || February 10, 2002 || Socorro || LINEAR || — || align=right data-sort-value="0.80" | 800 m || 
|-id=953 bgcolor=#d6d6d6
| 369953 ||  || — || August 4, 2003 || Kitt Peak || Spacewatch || VER || align=right | 3.1 km || 
|-id=954 bgcolor=#E9E9E9
| 369954 ||  || — || August 27, 2005 || Palomar || NEAT || — || align=right | 2.2 km || 
|-id=955 bgcolor=#FA8072
| 369955 ||  || — || November 30, 2003 || Kitt Peak || Spacewatch || — || align=right | 1.0 km || 
|-id=956 bgcolor=#d6d6d6
| 369956 || 6241 P-L || — || September 24, 1960 || Palomar || PLS || — || align=right | 2.9 km || 
|-id=957 bgcolor=#fefefe
| 369957 ||  || — || October 11, 1993 || La Silla || E. W. Elst || — || align=right data-sort-value="0.87" | 870 m || 
|-id=958 bgcolor=#E9E9E9
| 369958 ||  || — || October 9, 1993 || La Silla || E. W. Elst || — || align=right | 1.1 km || 
|-id=959 bgcolor=#d6d6d6
| 369959 ||  || — || September 12, 1994 || Kitt Peak || Spacewatch || — || align=right | 2.8 km || 
|-id=960 bgcolor=#d6d6d6
| 369960 ||  || — || September 12, 1994 || Kitt Peak || Spacewatch || KOR || align=right | 1.3 km || 
|-id=961 bgcolor=#fefefe
| 369961 ||  || — || September 5, 1994 || Kitt Peak || Spacewatch || — || align=right | 1.1 km || 
|-id=962 bgcolor=#d6d6d6
| 369962 ||  || — || October 28, 1994 || Kitt Peak || Spacewatch || — || align=right | 3.2 km || 
|-id=963 bgcolor=#E9E9E9
| 369963 ||  || — || July 22, 1995 || Kitt Peak || Spacewatch || — || align=right | 2.4 km || 
|-id=964 bgcolor=#fefefe
| 369964 ||  || — || September 21, 1995 || Kitt Peak || Spacewatch || MAS || align=right data-sort-value="0.54" | 540 m || 
|-id=965 bgcolor=#fefefe
| 369965 ||  || — || September 25, 1995 || Kitt Peak || Spacewatch || EUT || align=right data-sort-value="0.51" | 510 m || 
|-id=966 bgcolor=#fefefe
| 369966 ||  || — || October 19, 1995 || Kitt Peak || Spacewatch || MAS || align=right data-sort-value="0.71" | 710 m || 
|-id=967 bgcolor=#E9E9E9
| 369967 ||  || — || October 19, 1995 || Kitt Peak || Spacewatch || MRX || align=right data-sort-value="0.93" | 930 m || 
|-id=968 bgcolor=#fefefe
| 369968 ||  || — || October 19, 1995 || Kitt Peak || Spacewatch || — || align=right data-sort-value="0.98" | 980 m || 
|-id=969 bgcolor=#E9E9E9
| 369969 ||  || — || November 16, 1995 || Kitt Peak || Spacewatch || NEM || align=right | 2.5 km || 
|-id=970 bgcolor=#fefefe
| 369970 ||  || — || January 14, 1996 || Kitt Peak || Spacewatch || V || align=right data-sort-value="0.65" | 650 m || 
|-id=971 bgcolor=#d6d6d6
| 369971 ||  || — || April 11, 1996 || Kitt Peak || Spacewatch || 628 || align=right | 2.3 km || 
|-id=972 bgcolor=#E9E9E9
| 369972 ||  || — || September 11, 1996 || Kitt Peak || Spacewatch || — || align=right | 1.2 km || 
|-id=973 bgcolor=#E9E9E9
| 369973 ||  || — || September 17, 1996 || Kitt Peak || Spacewatch || — || align=right | 1.3 km || 
|-id=974 bgcolor=#fefefe
| 369974 ||  || — || October 11, 1996 || Kitt Peak || Spacewatch || — || align=right | 1.0 km || 
|-id=975 bgcolor=#E9E9E9
| 369975 ||  || — || December 1, 1996 || Kitt Peak || Spacewatch || — || align=right | 1.3 km || 
|-id=976 bgcolor=#E9E9E9
| 369976 ||  || — || January 3, 1997 || Kitt Peak || Spacewatch || — || align=right | 2.1 km || 
|-id=977 bgcolor=#C2FFFF
| 369977 ||  || — || May 9, 1997 || Kitt Peak || Spacewatch || L5 || align=right | 14 km || 
|-id=978 bgcolor=#E9E9E9
| 369978 ||  || — || September 23, 1997 || Kitt Peak || Spacewatch || — || align=right | 1.4 km || 
|-id=979 bgcolor=#d6d6d6
| 369979 ||  || — || September 23, 1997 || Kitt Peak || Spacewatch || — || align=right | 3.4 km || 
|-id=980 bgcolor=#d6d6d6
| 369980 ||  || — || October 7, 1997 || Kitt Peak || Spacewatch || 3:2 || align=right | 4.7 km || 
|-id=981 bgcolor=#E9E9E9
| 369981 ||  || — || November 20, 1997 || Kitt Peak || Spacewatch || — || align=right | 1.2 km || 
|-id=982 bgcolor=#E9E9E9
| 369982 ||  || — || January 20, 1998 || Mount Hopkins || C. W. Hergenrother || — || align=right | 2.2 km || 
|-id=983 bgcolor=#FFC2E0
| 369983 ||  || — || August 26, 1998 || Kitt Peak || Spacewatch || AMOcritical || align=right data-sort-value="0.36" | 360 m || 
|-id=984 bgcolor=#FFC2E0
| 369984 ||  || — || August 27, 1998 || Socorro || LINEAR || APOslowcritical || align=right data-sort-value="0.62" | 620 m || 
|-id=985 bgcolor=#fefefe
| 369985 ||  || — || September 15, 1998 || Kitt Peak || Spacewatch || — || align=right data-sort-value="0.71" | 710 m || 
|-id=986 bgcolor=#FFC2E0
| 369986 ||  || — || September 16, 1998 || Kitt Peak || Spacewatch || ATE || align=right data-sort-value="0.27" | 270 m || 
|-id=987 bgcolor=#d6d6d6
| 369987 ||  || — || September 26, 1998 || Kitt Peak || Spacewatch || SHU3:2 || align=right | 5.0 km || 
|-id=988 bgcolor=#fefefe
| 369988 ||  || — || September 26, 1998 || Socorro || LINEAR || — || align=right data-sort-value="0.94" | 940 m || 
|-id=989 bgcolor=#d6d6d6
| 369989 ||  || — || November 17, 1998 || La Palma || A. Fitzsimmons || — || align=right | 1.8 km || 
|-id=990 bgcolor=#E9E9E9
| 369990 ||  || — || January 7, 1999 || Kitt Peak || Spacewatch || — || align=right | 1.0 km || 
|-id=991 bgcolor=#E9E9E9
| 369991 ||  || — || January 9, 1999 || Kitt Peak || Spacewatch || — || align=right data-sort-value="0.93" | 930 m || 
|-id=992 bgcolor=#fefefe
| 369992 ||  || — || March 13, 1999 || Kitt Peak || Spacewatch || H || align=right data-sort-value="0.85" | 850 m || 
|-id=993 bgcolor=#FA8072
| 369993 ||  || — || September 11, 1999 || Socorro || LINEAR || — || align=right data-sort-value="0.90" | 900 m || 
|-id=994 bgcolor=#FA8072
| 369994 ||  || — || September 7, 1999 || Socorro || LINEAR || — || align=right data-sort-value="0.88" | 880 m || 
|-id=995 bgcolor=#FA8072
| 369995 ||  || — || September 8, 1999 || Socorro || LINEAR || — || align=right | 3.8 km || 
|-id=996 bgcolor=#E9E9E9
| 369996 ||  || — || October 2, 1999 || Socorro || LINEAR || — || align=right | 2.8 km || 
|-id=997 bgcolor=#E9E9E9
| 369997 ||  || — || October 4, 1999 || Kitt Peak || Spacewatch || AGN || align=right | 1.2 km || 
|-id=998 bgcolor=#d6d6d6
| 369998 ||  || — || October 6, 1999 || Kitt Peak || Spacewatch || — || align=right | 3.0 km || 
|-id=999 bgcolor=#fefefe
| 369999 ||  || — || October 7, 1999 || Kitt Peak || Spacewatch || FLO || align=right data-sort-value="0.65" | 650 m || 
|-id=000 bgcolor=#E9E9E9
| 370000 ||  || — || October 15, 1999 || Socorro || LINEAR || — || align=right | 2.4 km || 
|}

References

External links 
 Discovery Circumstances: Numbered Minor Planets (365001)–(370000) (IAU Minor Planet Center)

0369